= List of Aphodiidae genera =

This is a list of 364 genera in the family Aphodiidae, according to sources that recognize this lineage as a family rather than a subfamily. Note that in many classifications, many of the genera listed here are classified as subgenera of the genus Aphodius, and fewer than 300 genera are recognized in total.

== Aphodiidae genera ==
- Acanthaphodius
- Acanthobodilus
- Acrossidius
- Acrossoides
- Acrossus Mulsant, 1842
- Adebrattia
- Adeloparius
- Afroataenius
- Afrodiapterna
- Afrodiastictus
- Afrotrichonotulus
- Aganocrossus
- Agoliinus Schmidt, 1913
- Agolius
- Agrilinellus Dellacasa, Dellacasa and Gordon, 2008
- Agrilinus
- Ahermodontus
- Aidophus Balthasar, 1963
- Airapus
- Alloblackburneus Bordat, 2009
- Allobodilus
- Alocoderus
- Amerilochus
- Amidorus
- Ammoecioides
- Ammoecius
- Anaetius
- Annegialia Howden, 1971
- Anomalurobius
- Anomius
- Aparammoecius
- Aphodaulacus
- Aphodiellus
- Aphodiopsis
- Aphodius Illiger, 1798
- Aphodobius
- Aphodoharmogaster
- Aphodopsammobius
- Aphotaenius Cartwright, 1952
- Apsteiniella
- Arupaia
- Aschnarhyparus
- Ataeniopsis Petrovitz, 1973
- Ataenius Harold, 1867
- Australagolius
- Australammoecius
- Australaphodius Balthasar, 1942
- Australoxenella
- Ballucus Gordon and Skelley, 2007
- Basilewskyanus
- Batesiana
- Biralus
- Blackburneus Schmidt, 1913
- Bobiricola
- Bodiloides
- Bodilopsis
- Bodilus
- Bordatius
- Boucomontiellus
- Brachiaphodius
- Brindalus
- Bruchaphodius
- Bruneixenus
- Calamosternus Motschulsky, 1859
- Caligodorus Gordon and Skelley, 2007
- Calocolobopterus
- Candezeollus
- Carinaulus
- Cartwrightia
- Cephalocyclus Dellacasa, Gordon and Dellacasa, 1998
- Cesamexico
- Chaetopisthes
- Cheleion
- Chilothorax Motschulsky, 1859
- Chittius
- Cinacanthus Schmidt, 1913
- Cnemargulus
- Cnematoplatys
- Cnemisus
- Coelotrachelus Schmidt, 1913
- Colobopteridius
- Colobopteroides
- Colobopterus Mulsant, 1842
- Coprimorphus
- Coptochiroides
- Coptochirus
- Corythoderus
- Craterocyphus
- Cryptaphodius
- Cryptoscatomaseter Gordon and Skelley, 2007
- Daintreeola
- Danielssonia
- Dellacasiellus Gordon and Skelley, 2007
- Dialytellus Brown, 1929
- Dialytes Harold, 1869
- Dialytodius Gordon and Skelley, 2007
- Diapterna Horn, 1887
- Diastictus Mulsant, 1842
- Didactylia
- Dilortomaeus
- Doaphius
- Drepanocanthoides
- Drepanocanthus
- Dudleyellus
- Emadiellus
- Eocorythoderus
- Erytodes
- Erytus
- Esymus
- Eudolus
- Euhemicyclium
- Euheptaulacus
- Euorodalus
- Euotophorus
- Euparia LePeletier and Serville, 1828
- Euparixia Brown, 1927
- Euparixoides
- Euparotrix
- Eupleurus Mulsant, 1842
- Exaphodius
- Exoxyomus
- Ferrerianus
- Flaviellus Gordon and Skelley, 2007
- Flechtmanniella
- Geomyphilus Gordon and Skelley, 2007
- Geopsammodius Gordon and Pittino, 1992
- Gilletianus
- Goiginus
- Gonaphodiellus
- Gonaphodioides
- Gonaphodiopsis
- Gonaphodius
- Gongrolophus
- Gordonius
- Grandinaphodius
- Granulopsammodius
- Guanyinaphodius
- Hadrorhyparus
- Harmodactylus
- Harmogaster
- Haroldaphodius
- Haroldiataenius Chalumeau, 1981
- Haroldiellus Gordon and Skelley, 2007
- Hemicyclium
- Hemycorythoderus
- Heptaulacus
- Hornietus Stebnicka, 2000
- Hornosus
- Iarupea
- Iguazua
- Ingogius
- Irrasinus Gordon and Skelley, 2007
- Jalisco
- Koreoxyomus
- Koshantschikovius
- Labarrus Mulsant and Rey, 1870
- Lechorodius Gordon and Skelley, 2007
- Leiopsammodius Rakovic, 1981
- Leptorhyparus
- Limarus
- Linargius
- Lindbergianus
- Lioglyptoxenus
- Liothorax Motschulsky, 1859
- Loboparius
- Lomanoxia
- Lomanoxoides
- Longaphodius
- Loraphodius
- Loraspis
- Lorditomaeus
- Lunaphodius
- Luxolinus Gordon and Skelley, 2007
- Macroretroides
- Macroretrus
- Maculaphodius Gordon and Skelley, 2007
- Martineziana Chalumeau and Ozdikmen, 2006
- Mecynodes
- Megateloides
- Megatelus
- Melinopterus Mulsant, 1842
- Mendidaphodius
- Mendidius Harold, 1868
- Merogyrus Gordon and Skelley, 2007
- Mesontoplatys
- Messyrhus
- Mesydra
- Microtermitodius
- Microteuchestes
- Monteitheolus
- Mothon
- Mozartius
- Myrhessus
- Myrmecaphodius
- Mysarus
- Nanotermitodius
- Napoa
- Neagolius
- Neocalaphodius
- Neocolobopterus
- Neodiapterna
- Neoemadiellus
- Neoheptaulacus
- Neopsammodius Rakovic, 1986
- Neorhyssemus
- Neotrichaphodioides
- Neotrichiorhyssemus
- Neotrichonotulus Dellacasa, Gordon and Dellacasa, 2004
- Nettelislasia
- Nialaphodius Kolbe, 1908
- Nialosternus
- Nialus
- Nimbus
- Nipponaphodius
- Nipponoagoliinus
- Nobiellus
- Nobius
- Nolicus
- Notocaulus
- Obaphodius
- Odochilus
- Odontacrossus
- Odontolochus
- Odontolytes Koshantschikov, 1916
- Odontopsammodius Gordon and Pittino, 1992
- Odontoxyomus
- Orammoecius
- Orocanthus
- Orodaliscoides
- Orodaliscus
- Oromus
- Oscarinus Gordon and Skelley, 2007
- Osmanius
- Otophorus Mulsant, 1842
- Oxyataenius
- Oxycorythus
- Oxyomoides
- Oxyomus Dejean, 1833
- Ozodius
- Parabodilus
- Paracoptochirus
- Paracorythoderus
- Paracrossidius
- Paradeloparius
- Paradidactylia
- Parammoecius
- Paranimbus
- Paraplesiataenius
- Parapsammodius Gordon and Pittino, 1992
- Pararhyssemus
- Parataenius Balthasar, 1961
- Paratrichaphodius
- Pardalosus Gordon and Skelley, 2007
- Passaliolla
- Paulianellus
- Petrovitzius
- Phaeaphodius Reitter, 1892
- Phalacronothus
- Pharaphodius
- Pholeoaphodius
- Phycochus
- Pittinius
- Plagiogonus
- Planolinellus Dellacasa and Dellacasa, 2005
- Planolinoides Dellacasa and Dellacasa, 2005
- Planolinus Mulsant and Rey, 1870
- Platyderides
- Platytomus Mulsant, 1842
- Pleuraphodius
- Pleurophorus Mulsant, 1842
- Podotenoides
- Podotenus
- Proctophanes
- Psammaegialia
- Psammodaphodius
- Psammodius Fallén, 1807
- Psammorpha
- Pseudacrossus
- Pseudagolius Schmidt, 1913
- Pseudataenius Brown, 1927
- Pseuderytus
- Pseudesymus
- Pseudoagoliinus
- Pseudoahermodontus
- Pseudoblackburneus
- Pseudocoelotrachelus
- Pseudodrepanocanthus
- Pseudogonaphodiellus
- Pseudoheptaulacus
- Pseudomothon
- Pseudopharaphodius
- Pseudopodotenus
- Pseudostereomera
- Pseudotetraclipeoides
- Pseudoteuchestes
- Pseudoxyomus
- Pterobius
- Pubinus
- Qingaphodius
- Rakovicius
- Renaudius
- Rhinocerotopsis
- Rhodaphodius
- Rhyparus
- Rhyssemodes
- Rhyssemorphus
- Rhyssemus Mulsant, 1842
- Rugaphodius Gordon and Skelley, 2007
- Sahlbergianus
- Saprolochus
- Saprositellus
- Saprosites Redtenbacher, 1858
- Saprovisca
- Sariangus
- Scabrostomus Gordon and Skelley, 2007
- Schaefferellus Gordon and Skelley, 2007
- Selviria
- Serraphodius
- Setodius Gordon and Skelley, 2007
- Setylaides
- Siamaphodius
- Sicardia
- Sigorus
- Simogonius
- Sinaphodius
- Sinodiapterna
- Sitiphus
- Skelleyanus
- Stebnickiella
- Stenotothorax Schmidt, 1913
- Stereomera
- Strigodius Gordon and Skelley, 2007
- Subrinus
- Sugrames
- Supertermitoderus
- Sussorca
- Sybacodes
- Sybax
- Symphodon
- Tanyana
- Termitaxis
- Termitoderus
- Termitodiellus
- Termitodius
- Termitopisthes
- Tesarius Rakovic, 1981
- Tetraclipeoides Schmidt, 1913
- Teuchestes Mulsant, 1842
- Thinorycter
- Trichaphodiellus
- Trichaphodioides
- Trichaphodius
- Trichiopsammobius
- Trichiorhyssemus Clouët, 1901
- Trichonotuloides
- Trichonotulus Bedel, 1911
- Trigonoscelus
- Tristaphodius
- Turanella
- Vladimirellus
- Volinus
- Xenoheptaulacus
- Xeropsamobeus Saylor, 1937
- Youngaphodius
