= Ataenius stebnickae =

Scientific classification
- Kingdom: Animalia
- Phylum: Arthropoda
- Clade: Pancrustacea
- Class: Insecta
- Order: Coleoptera
- Suborder: Polyphaga
- Infraorder: Scarabaeiformia
- Family: Scarabaeidae
- Genus: Ataenius
- Species: A. stebnickae

Binomial name
- Ataenius stebnickae Bordat & Théry, 2012

Species of beetle

Ataenius stebnickae is a species of beetle of the family Scarabaeidae. It is found in New Caledonia.

== Description ==
Adults reach a length of about 3.6–4.4 mm (0.14–0.17 in). They have a convex, glossy, pubescent body. The head is reddish-brown, but darker on the frons and the pronotum is dark brown with the margin and anterior angles reddish-brown. There is sometimes a reddish-brown basal spot near the disc. The scutellum is reddish-brown and the elytra are yellowish-brown, sometimes with a darker discal spot. The legs are reddish-brown.

== Etymology ==
The species is named in honour of Aphodiidae specialist Z. T. Stebnicka.
