= Ataenius longiclavus =

Scientific classification
- Kingdom: Animalia
- Phylum: Arthropoda
- Clade: Pancrustacea
- Class: Insecta
- Order: Coleoptera
- Suborder: Polyphaga
- Infraorder: Scarabaeiformia
- Family: Scarabaeidae
- Genus: Ataenius
- Species: A. longiclavus

Binomial name
- Ataenius longiclavus Petrovitz, 1970

Species of beetle

Ataenius longiclavus is a species of beetle of the family Scarabaeidae. It is found in Brazil (Rio Grande do Sul).

== Description ==
Adults reach a length of about 4–4.2 mm (0.16–0.17 in). They have an elongate oval, strongly alutaceous, piceous body, with the elytra lighter than the fore body. They have an elongate antennal club typical for Melolonthinae and which is very rare amongst species of the Aphodiinae subfamily.
