= Ataenius aphodiiformis =

Scientific classification
- Kingdom: Animalia
- Phylum: Arthropoda
- Clade: Pancrustacea
- Class: Insecta
- Order: Coleoptera
- Suborder: Polyphaga
- Infraorder: Scarabaeiformia
- Family: Scarabaeidae
- Genus: Ataenius
- Species: A. aphodiiformis

Binomial name
- Ataenius aphodiiformis Bordat & Théry, 2012

Species of beetle

Ataenius aphodiiformis is a species of beetle of the family Scarabaeidae. It is found in New Caledonia.

== Description ==
Adults reach a length of about 3.7 mm (0.15 in). They have a convex, dark brown body, with the front of the head, the anterior angles of the pronotum, the humeral callus, the first interval, and the bases of intervals 2 and 3 paler. The elytra have fine hairs.

== Etymology ==
The species name refers to its resemblance to species of the subfamily Aphodiinae.
