= Karolinella =

Scientific classification
- Kingdom: Animalia
- Phylum: Arthropoda
- Clade: Pancrustacea
- Class: Insecta
- Order: Coleoptera
- Suborder: Polyphaga
- Infraorder: Scarabaeiformia
- Family: Scarabaeidae
- Subfamily: Aphodiinae
- Tribe: Aphodiini
- Genus: Karolinella; Minkina, 2017
- Species: K. karolinaezuzannae

Binomial name
- Karolinella karolinaezuzannae Minkina, 2017

Genus of beetles

Karolinella is a genus of beetle of the family Scarabaeidae. It is monotypic, being represented by the single species, Karolinella karolinaezuzannae, which is found in China (Sichuan).

== Description ==
Adults reach a length of about 5.5 mm (0.22 in). They have an elongate, moderately convex body, with the head and pronotum blackish and the elytra dark brown, although slightly paler on the sides before the apex. The dorsal surface is glabrous.

== Etymology ==
The names of the genus and species are both dedicated to the daughter of the author, Karolina (Zuzanna).
