= Ataenius rakovici =

Scientific classification
- Kingdom: Animalia
- Phylum: Arthropoda
- Clade: Pancrustacea
- Class: Insecta
- Order: Coleoptera
- Suborder: Polyphaga
- Infraorder: Scarabaeiformia
- Family: Scarabaeidae
- Genus: Ataenius
- Species: A. rakovici

Binomial name
- Ataenius rakovici Bordat & Théry, 2012

Species of beetle

Ataenius rakovici is a species of beetle of the family Scarabaeidae. It is found in New Caledonia.

== Description ==
Adults reach a length of about 4–4.2 mm (0.16–0.17 in). They have a convex, partly pubescent, dark reddish-brown, body with the fore-head, sides of the pronotum and bases of intervals 1, 3, 6, and 7 paler. The legs are reddish-brown.

== Etymology ==
The species is named in honour of Aphodiidae specialist M. Rakovič.
