= Mothon sarmaticus =

Scientific classification
- Kingdom: Animalia
- Phylum: Arthropoda
- Clade: Pancrustacea
- Class: Insecta
- Order: Coleoptera
- Suborder: Polyphaga
- Infraorder: Scarabaeiformia
- Family: Scarabaeidae
- Subfamily: Aphodiinae
- Tribe: Aphodiini
- Genus: Mothon; Semenov & Medvedev, 1927
- Species: M. sarmaticus

Binomial name
- Mothon sarmaticus (Semenov & Medvedev, 1927)

Synonyms
- Aphodius (Mothon) Semenov & Medvedev, 1927; Aphodius (Mothon) sarmaticus Semenov & Medvedev, 1927

Genus of beetles

Mothon is a genus of beetle of the family Scarabaeidae. It is monotypic, being represented by the single species, Mothon sarmaticus, which is found in Romania, Russia and Ukraine.

== Description ==
Adults reach a length of about 4–5 mm (0.16–0.20 in). They have a rather stout, strongly convex, moderately shiny, glabrous, reddish-testaceous body, with the lateral margins of the head and pronotum, as well as the scutellum and elytra pale testaceous, the latter with darker suture.
