= Cantotius =

Scientific classification
- Kingdom: Animalia
- Phylum: Arthropoda
- Clade: Pancrustacea
- Class: Insecta
- Order: Coleoptera
- Suborder: Polyphaga
- Infraorder: Scarabaeiformia
- Family: Scarabaeidae
- Subfamily: Aphodiinae
- Tribe: Aphodiini
- Genus: Cantotius; Bordat, 2022
- Species: C. sexmaculosus

Binomial name
- Cantotius sexmaculosus (Schmidt, 1911)

Synonyms
- Aphodius sexmaculosus Schmidt, 1911; Aphodius (Orodalus) bredoi Endrödi, 1964; Aphodius (Orodalus) bredoi centratus Endrödi, 1964; Aphodius (Orodalus) bredoi connectus Endrödi, 1964

Genus of beetles

Cantotius is a genus of beetle of the family Scarabaeidae. It is monotypic, being represented by the single species, Cantotius sexmaculosus, which is found in Botswana, Burkina Faso, Chad, Ghana, Ivory Coast, Malawi, Mali, Niger, the Democratic Republic of the Congo, the Republic of the Congo, Senegal, Sudan and Zambia.

== Description ==
Adults reach a length of about 2.25 mm (0.089 in). They have a slightly convex, shiny body. The elytra are hairy along the sides and before the apex. The head and thorax are dark, with the anterior margin of the former reddish and the lateral margin of the latter, as well as the elytra, yellowish-brown. The elytra have a dark suture and black spots.
