= Siamaphodius =

Scientific classification
- Kingdom: Animalia
- Phylum: Arthropoda
- Clade: Pancrustacea
- Class: Insecta
- Order: Coleoptera
- Suborder: Polyphaga
- Infraorder: Scarabaeiformia
- Family: Scarabaeidae
- Subfamily: Aphodiinae
- Tribe: Aphodiini
- Genus: Siamaphodius; Masumoto, 1991
- Species: S. naafon

Binomial name
- Siamaphodius naafon (Masumoto, 1991)

Synonyms
- Aphodius (Siamaphodius) Masumoto, 1991; Aphodius (Siamaphodius) naafon Masumoto, 1991

Genus of beetles

Siamaphodius is a genus of beetle of the family Scarabaeidae. It is monotypic, being represented by the single species, Siamaphodius naafon, which is found in Thailand.

== Description ==
Adults reach a length of about 3.5–4.5 mm (0.14–0.18 in). They have a moderately convex, rather stout, shiny, glabrous, dark brown body, with the clypeus, sides of the pronotum and lateral margin of the elytra reddish.
