= Podotenoides =

Scientific classification
- Kingdom: Animalia
- Phylum: Arthropoda
- Clade: Pancrustacea
- Class: Insecta
- Order: Coleoptera
- Suborder: Polyphaga
- Infraorder: Scarabaeiformia
- Family: Scarabaeidae
- Subfamily: Aphodiinae
- Tribe: Aphodiini
- Genus: Podotenoides; Paulian, 1942
- Species: P. jeannelianus

Binomial name
- Podotenoides jeannelianus (Balthasar, 1945)

Synonyms
- Aphodius (Podotenoides) jeannelianus Balthasar, 1945; Podotenoides jeanneli Paulian, 1942

Genus of beetles

Podotenoides is a genus of beetle of the family Scarabaeidae. It is monotypic, being represented by the single species, Podotenoides jeannelianus, which is found in eastern Africa.

== Description ==
Adults reach a length of about 5.5–6.5 mm (0.22–0.26 in). They have a rather elongate, convex body. The head and pronotum are shiny, while the elytra are dull. The sides of the pronotum and elytral interstices have short hairs. They are mostly dark brown, but part of the head, the sides of the pronotum and sometimes the elytra are paler. The legs are brown-reddish.
