= Erytodes =

Scientific classification
- Kingdom: Animalia
- Phylum: Arthropoda
- Clade: Pancrustacea
- Class: Insecta
- Order: Coleoptera
- Suborder: Polyphaga
- Infraorder: Scarabaeiformia
- Family: Scarabaeidae
- Subfamily: Aphodiinae
- Tribe: Aphodiini
- Genus: Erytodes; Schmidt, 1917
- Species: E. confirmatus

Binomial name
- Erytodes confirmatus (Schmidt, 1917)

Synonyms
- Aphodius (Erytodes) Schmidt, 1917; Aphodius (Erytodes) confirmatus Schmidt, 1917

Genus of beetles

Erytodes is a genus of beetle of the family Scarabaeidae. It is monotypic, being represented by the single species, Erytodes confirmatus, which is found in India (Tamil Nadu).

== Description ==
Adults reach a length of about 5.5 mm (0.22 in). They have an elongate-oval, strongly convex, shiny, glabrous, dark brown-reddish body, with the margin of the clypeus, sides and base of the pronotum, scutellum and elytral base paler.
