= Rugaphodius =

Scientific classification
- Kingdom: Animalia
- Phylum: Arthropoda
- Clade: Pancrustacea
- Class: Insecta
- Order: Coleoptera
- Suborder: Polyphaga
- Infraorder: Scarabaeiformia
- Family: Scarabaeidae
- Subfamily: Aphodiinae
- Tribe: Aphodiini
- Genus: Rugaphodius; Gordon & Skelley, 2007
- Species: R. rugatus

Binomial name
- Rugaphodius rugatus (Schmidt, 1907)

Synonyms
- Aphodius rugatus Schmidt, 1907; Aphodius rugifrons Horn, 1871

Genus of beetles

Rugaphodius is a genus of beetle of the family Scarabaeidae. It is monotypic, being represented by the single species, Rugaphodius rugatus, which is found in the United States (California) and Mexico (Baja California).

== Description ==
Adults reach a length of about 2.7–3.5 mm (0.11–0.14 in). They have an elongate, black body. The elytra are yellowish with black markings.

== Life history ==
They are thought to be detritivores.
