= Pseuderytus =

Scientific classification
- Kingdom: Animalia
- Phylum: Arthropoda
- Clade: Pancrustacea
- Class: Insecta
- Order: Coleoptera
- Suborder: Polyphaga
- Infraorder: Scarabaeiformia
- Family: Scarabaeidae
- Subfamily: Aphodiinae
- Tribe: Aphodiini
- Genus: Pseuderytus; Hollande & Thérond, 1998
- Species: P. chobauti

Binomial name
- Pseuderytus chobauti (Clouët, 1896)

Synonyms
- Aphodius (Erytus) chobauti Clouët, 1896; Aphodius (Mendidaphodius) oasis Baraud, 1976; Aphodius (Calamosternus) pseudounicolor Balthasar, 1960; Aphodius (Mendidius) saharicus Balthasar, 1941; Aphodius (Calamosternus) moltonii Schatzmayr, 1938

Genus of beetles

Pseuderytus is a genus of beetle of the family Scarabaeidae. It is monotypic, being represented by the single species, Pseuderytus chobauti, which is found in Algeria, Egypt, Iran, Iraq, Jordan, Libya, Mauretania, Morocco, Palestina, Saudi Arabia, Tunisia and the United Arab Emirates.

== Description ==
Adults reach a length of about 4–6 mm (0.16–0.24 in). They have an elongate, subcylindrical, convex, shiny, glabrous, reddish-testaceous body, with the head, pronotum and the lateral margins, base, and suture of the elytra dark brownish. The frontal suture and two spots on the sides of the pronotum are also dark brownish.
