= Longaphodius =

Scientific classification
- Kingdom: Animalia
- Phylum: Arthropoda
- Clade: Pancrustacea
- Class: Insecta
- Order: Coleoptera
- Suborder: Polyphaga
- Infraorder: Scarabaeiformia
- Family: Scarabaeidae
- Subfamily: Aphodiinae
- Tribe: Aphodiini
- Genus: Longaphodius; Endrödi, 1980
- Species: L. namaquarum

Binomial name
- Longaphodius namaquarum (Endrödi, 1980)

Synonyms
- Aphodius (Longaphodius) Endrödi, 1980; Aphodius (Longaphodius) namaquarum Endrödi, 1980

Genus of beetles

Longaphodius is a genus of beetle of the family Scarabaeidae. It is monotypic, being represented by the single species, Longaphodius namaquarum, which is found in Namibia.

== Description ==
Adults reach a length of about 5–5.5 mm (0.20–0.22 in). They have an elongate, moderately convex, shiny, pubescent, translucid, pale testaceous body.
