= Pseudesymus =

Scientific classification
- Kingdom: Animalia
- Phylum: Arthropoda
- Clade: Pancrustacea
- Class: Insecta
- Order: Coleoptera
- Suborder: Polyphaga
- Infraorder: Scarabaeiformia
- Family: Scarabaeidae
- Subfamily: Aphodiinae
- Tribe: Aphodiini
- Genus: Pseudesymus; Orbigny, 1896
- Species: P. lucidus

Binomial name
- Pseudesymus lucidus (Klug, 1830)

Synonyms
- Aphodius (Pseudesymus) Orbigny, 1896; Aphodius lucidus Klug, 1830; Aphodius taeniatus Wollaston, 1864

Genus of beetles

Pseudesymus is a genus of beetle of the family Scarabaeidae. It is monotypic, being represented by the single species, Pseudesymus lucidus, which is found in Afghanistan, Algeria, the Canary Islands, Egypt, Iran, Iraq, Israel, Kazakhstan, Kuwait, Libya, Morocco, Russia, Saudi Arabia, Spain, Tunisia, Turkmenistan, the United Arab Emirates and Uzbekistan.

== Description ==
Adults reach a length of about 4.5–6 mm (0.18–0.24 in). They have an elongate, subcylindrical, convex, shiny, glabrous body. The head and pronotum are black, the latter with the front angles testaceous. The scutellum is blackish and the elytra are pale yellow. The legs are reddish and the antennal club is yellowish.
