= Koreoxyomus =

Scientific classification
- Kingdom: Animalia
- Phylum: Arthropoda
- Clade: Pancrustacea
- Class: Insecta
- Order: Coleoptera
- Suborder: Polyphaga
- Infraorder: Scarabaeiformia
- Family: Scarabaeidae
- Subfamily: Aphodiinae
- Tribe: Aphodiini
- Genus: Koreoxyomus; Kim, 1996
- Species: K. koreanus

Binomial name
- Koreoxyomus koreanus Kim, 1996

Genus of beetles

Koreoxyomus is a genus of beetle of the family Scarabaeidae. It is monotypic, being represented by the single species, Koreoxyomus koreanus, which is found in South Korea.

== Description ==
Adults reach a length of about 4–5 mm (0.16–0.20 in) and are apterous. They have an oblong, convex, moderately shiny, nearly glabrous, piceous or piceous-reddish body, with the head, front angles of the pronotum and legs brown-reddish and with the club of the antennae brown-yellowish.
