= Paracoptochirus =

Scientific classification
- Kingdom: Animalia
- Phylum: Arthropoda
- Clade: Pancrustacea
- Class: Insecta
- Order: Coleoptera
- Suborder: Polyphaga
- Infraorder: Scarabaeiformia
- Family: Scarabaeidae
- Subfamily: Aphodiinae
- Tribe: Aphodiini
- Genus: Paracoptochirus; Balthasar, 1963

Genus of beetles

Paracoptochirus is a genus of beetles of the family Scarabaeidae.

== Species ==
- Paracoptochirus kozanensis Pittino, 2001
- Paracoptochirus petrovitzi Branco & Baraud, 1988
- Paracoptochirus singularis (Harold, 1868)
- Paracoptochirus vignai Carpaneto & Piattella, 1990
