= Youngaphodius =

Scientific classification
- Kingdom: Animalia
- Phylum: Arthropoda
- Clade: Pancrustacea
- Class: Insecta
- Order: Coleoptera
- Suborder: Polyphaga
- Infraorder: Scarabaeiformia
- Family: Scarabaeidae
- Subfamily: Aphodiinae
- Tribe: Aphodiini
- Genus: Youngaphodius; Bordat, 1988
- Species: Y. agullasi

Binomial name
- Youngaphodius agullasi (Endrödi, 1983)

Synonyms
- Aphodius (Youngaphodius) Bordat, 1988; Aphodius (Blackburneus) agullasi Endrödi, 1983

Genus of beetles

Youngaphodius is a genus of beetle of the family Scarabaeidae. It is monotypic, being represented by the single species, Youngaphodius agullasi, which is found in the sand dunes of Cape Agulhas in South Africa.

== Description ==
Adults reach a length of about 4–4.5 mm (0.16–0.18 in). They have an oval-elongate, moderately convex, shiny, nearly glabrous body, although there are some hairs on the elytra laterally and toward the apex. They are brown-yellowish, with the anterior margin and two lateral spots of the pronotum and the elytral suture dark brown.
