= Colobopteroides =

Scientific classification
- Kingdom: Animalia
- Phylum: Arthropoda
- Clade: Pancrustacea
- Class: Insecta
- Order: Coleoptera
- Suborder: Polyphaga
- Infraorder: Scarabaeiformia
- Family: Scarabaeidae
- Subfamily: Aphodiinae
- Tribe: Aphodiini
- Genus: Colobopteroides; Paulian, 1942
- Species: C. latus

Binomial name
- Colobopteroides latus (Schmidt, 1910)

Synonyms
- Aphodius latus Schmidt, 1910; Aphodius (Limarus) rugulicollis coryndoni Paulian, 1939; Aphodius latus muricatus Koshantschikov

Genus of beetles

Colobopteroides is a genus of beetle of the family Scarabaeidae. It is monotypic, being represented by the single species, Colobopteroides latus, which is found in Ethiopia, Kenya and Tanzania.

== Description ==
Adults reach a length of about 4–5 mm (0.16–0.20 in). They have a short, oval, strongly convex, quite pubescent, moderately shiny, piceous black body.

== Subspecies ==
- Colobopteroides latus latus (Ethiopia, Kenya, Tanzania)
- Colobopteroides latus coryndoni (Paulian, 1939) (Kenya)
