= Termitoderini =

- Termitoderus grassei

Scientific classification
- Kingdom: Animalia
- Phylum: Arthropoda
- Clade: Pancrustacea
- Class: Insecta
- Order: Coleoptera
- Suborder: Polyphaga
- Infraorder: Scarabaeiformia
- Family: Scarabaeidae
- Subfamily: Aphodiinae
- Tribe: Termitoderini; Tangelder & Krikken, 1982

Tribe of beetles

Termitoderini is a tribe of scarab beetles in the family Scarabaeidae. There are at least two genera and about six described species in Termitoderini. They are found in tropical Africa.

== Genera ==
These two genera belong to the tribe Termitoderini:

- Supertermitoderus Mencl, 2011
- Termitoderus Mateu, 1966
