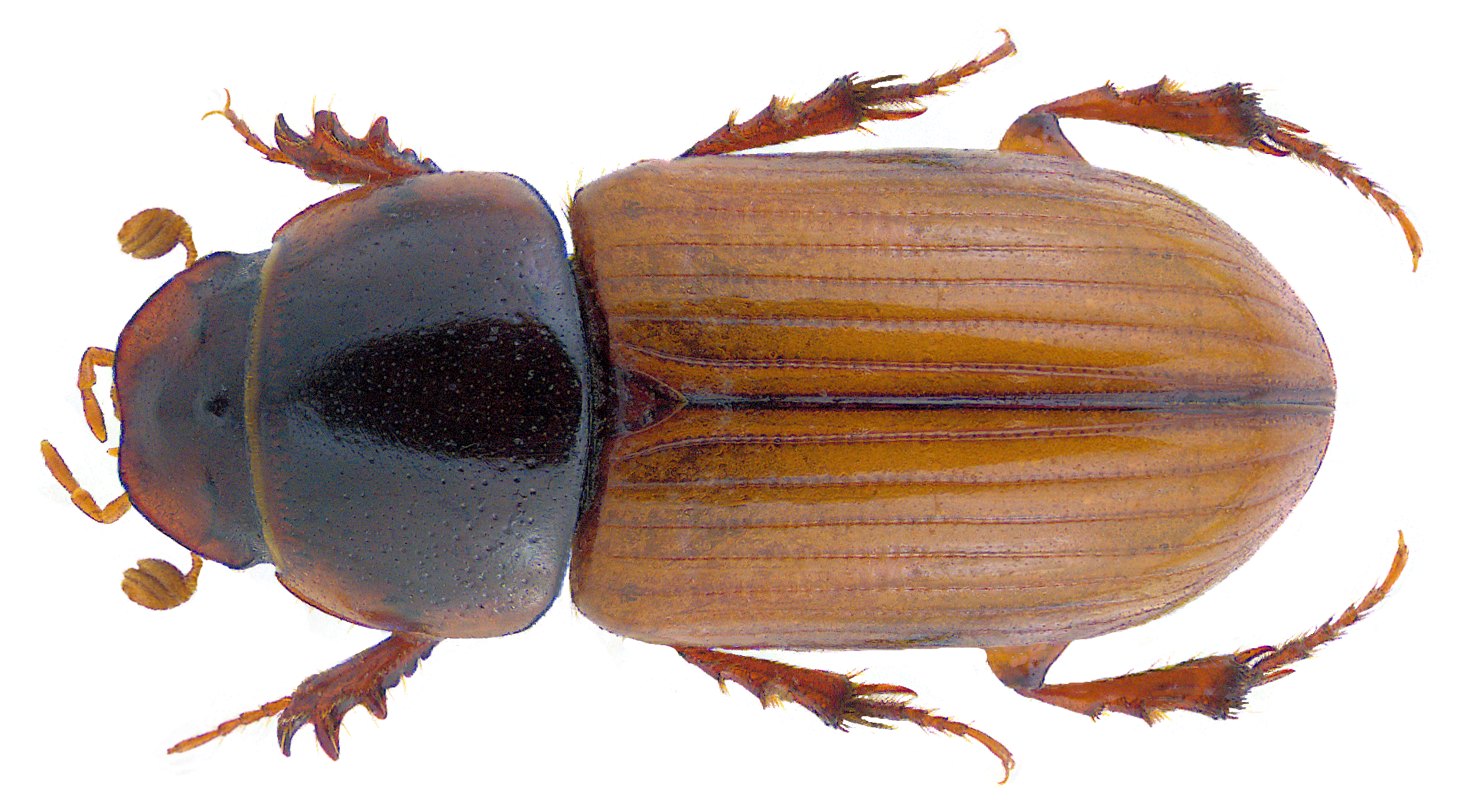
- Bodiloides ictericus 4.9 mm (4.0 to 5.0 mm) Germany

Scientific classification
- Kingdom: Animalia
- Phylum: Arthropoda
- Clade: Pancrustacea
- Class: Insecta
- Order: Coleoptera
- Suborder: Polyphaga
- Infraorder: Scarabaeiformia
- Family: Scarabaeidae
- Genus: Bodiloides
- Species: B. ictericus

Binomial name
- Bodiloides ictericus (Laicharting, 1781)

Synonyms
- Aphodius ictericus; Scarabaeus ictericus Laicharting, 1781; Scarabaeus nitidulus; Aphodius (Bodilus) ghardimaouensis Balthasar, 1929; Aphodius (Bodilus) lychnobius Petrovitz, 1954; Aphodius (Bodilus) crimensis Koshantschikov, 1913; Aphodius nitidulus melanescens Bouskell, 1901; Aphodius nitidulus pallescens Bouskell, 1901; Aphodius gilvus Schmidt, 1840; Scarabaeus ictericus Paykull, 1798; Scarabaeus nitidulus Fabricius, 1792

= Bodiloides ictericus =

Species of beetle

Bodiloides ictericus is a species of dung beetle in the family Scarabaeidae, found in the Palearctic. It is one of the species in the genus Bodiloides.

Bodiloides ictericus was formerly classified as Scarabaeus nitidulus, Scarabaeus ictericus, and Aphodius nitidulus. It has two subspecies, Bodiloides ictericus ictericus and Bodiloides ictericus ghardimaouensis.

== Notes on the name ==
This species was described by Laicharting under the name Scarabaeus ictericus in 1781. The description is in German, starts with the German name and ends with a short Latin description. Laicharting called the beetle "Gelbsüchtiger Dungkäfer", or "jaundiced dung beetle". The part of the name jaundice corresponds to the Latin epithet ictericus (from ancient Greek ικτερικός ikterikós, jaundiced). It apparently refers to the yellowish elytra, not the red.

When the large genus Scarabaeus was split up, the species was moved to the genus Aphódius ("dung beetle", after ancient Greek άφοδος áphodos for defecation, excrement). The name Bodilus is from Mulsant & Rey 1871, established as a subgenus of Aphodius and promoted to genus by Paulian in 1942. The name Bódilus is meaningless according to Berthold Schenkling. At times Aphodius ictericus was considered a color variant of Aphodius merdarius.

The descriptions and the naming of the species demonstrate the problematic situation of entomology at that time. Mulsant took Scarabaeus ictericus Laicharting 1781 to be a color variant of Scarabaeus merdarius Fabricius 1775. This view was adopted by other authors who used Scarabaeus ictericus Laicharting spelled incorrectly Scarabaeus icterus or Scarabaeus ictericus Laichs as a local variety or aberration of the previously described Scarabaeus merdarius. Mulsant mentions in the same work, a few pages above, Scarabaeus ictericus Moll 1785 and Scarabaeus ictericus Paykull 1798 as synonyms to Scarabaeus nitidulus Fabricius 1792. Since nitidulus Fabricius and merdarius Fabricius differ significantly, Mulsant must have been of the opinion, ictericus Laicharting and ictericus Paykull were different.

On the other hand, Von Moll explained in a letter that his ictericus is the beetle described by Laicharting as ictericus, and Paykull noted that he described the ictericus of Von Moll. Paykull described the beetle of Laicharting.

In any case, Louis Bedel 1911 used ictericus Laicharting as a synonym for Scarabaeus nitidulus Fabricius 1792. Because the description von Laicharting is older, the species is now named after him. However, this assessment is not generally accepted. Báguena Corella identified the species described here as Aphodius (Bodilus) nitidulus Fabricius = Scarabaeus nitidulus Fabricius, in a work about the scarab beetles in Spain in 1955. Corella expressed that in his opinion the species was wrongly named after Laicharting and only Paykull 1798 was the same beetle as Fabricius described. The clarification of the contradictions would be possible by considering the holotypes of Laicharting, whose whereabouts are not known. According to Dellacasa & Dellacasa, Scarabaeus ictericus Laicharting 1781 is the type species for the new genus Bodiloides, which is a species of the old genus Bodilus. It is called accordingly Bodiloides ictericus.

== Description of the beetle ==
The four to five millimeter long beetle is cylindrical to oval. The elytra are typically shiny, light yellow-brown, the head, breast shield and underside are darker.

The head is red-brown at least in front, but can also be predominantly black-brown. It is only slightly arched and inclined only a little forward. It is finely punctate, coarser on the front. On the forehead it has three humps, which are inconspicuous, especially in females, the middle one being the most obvious (Fig. 2). Viewed from above, the head is not very wide. The lighter front edge of the head shield is broadly edged with rounded front corners. The cheeks in front of the flat eyes protrude slightly. The antennae are nine-segmented. The second segment is longer than the following five segments combined. The antennae tip is a gray-yellow, three-part, elongated round club.

The pronotum is almost entirely brown-red or black, only laterally it is yellow-brown at the edge, at least at the back. The punctation is coarser, especially towards the sides, than that of the head, with much smaller punctures interspersed (double punctation, the large punctures as umbilical points). The pronotum base is edged, and the edge disappears in the middle of the base. The rear angles are rounded.

The light yellow-brown and bald elytra shine, also at the clearly punctate tips (Fig. 6). This is an important feature for determination. Occasionally the elytra are also pale yellow or reddish brown. Each elytra has ten flat, deepened vertical stripes made of fine punctation. These deepen and widen towards the rear, but do not reach the posterior edge of the elytra (Fig. 6). The seventh and eighth stripes are shortened at the front (Fig. 1). The intervals between the punctate strips are barely arched and finely and scatteredly punctate, towards the end the punctures become denser and stronger. The pointed triangular (not pentagonal) scutellum is clearly recognizable, but not noticeably long. Viewed from the front, the leading edge is no narrower than the first two intervals combined. The label is usually dark, as is the medial edges of the elytra. According to the original description, the outer edge of the elytra are also dark. Also in a description of the insects of Bavaria from 1798, the elytra of the jaundice beetle are referred to as fringed with black everywhere. However, this does not apply in general.

The underside is more or less dark, depending on the head and breast shield, but the last abdominal segments are lighter on the underside (Fig. 4). The forelegs are designed as grave legs with strong external teeth on the rails. The upper end spine of the posterior splint (green in Fig. 5) is shorter than the first link of the hind tarsi (tinted blue in Fig. 5). This is as long as the following two terms together. The middle and rear rails have cross bars. At the lower edge of the middle and rear rails there are two terminal spikes of approximately the same length and a wreath of relatively short, blunt bristles of approximately the same length.

The subspecies ghardimaouensis Balthasar 1929 differs from the nominate subspecies in that the label is not only punctate at the end, but over half of it. Furthermore, the upper end spine of the rear rail is longer than the first tarsal link and this shorter than the second and third link together, the fall of the wing-coverts is very fine and hairy. In addition, the individuals are somewhat larger and differ in the structure of the sexual organs.

== Biology ==
Already in the first description it is noted that the species in Kühkoth is very common, and is therefore often found in cattle manure. For England it is stated to be often in somewhat dry horse manure in open terrain, not on grass. In Spain the beetle is also found in sheep dung. In Central Europe, the beetles can be found on sandy banks, overgrown dunes, sandy pastures, floodplains and ruderal areas.

Aphodius and Bodiloides species usually develop within the dung heaps. However, a more recent study in southern Spain has shown that in a very dry area there, the larvae of a large number of these species develop in portions of feces that have been buried by other beetle species and are thus better protected from drying out. This behavior was not found in Bodiloides ictericus. The animals lay their eggs in the dung piles (in this case sheep droppings) in autumn. When scarab beetles were divided into several groups according to their appearance in Voronezh Oblast, the species were divided into the species-poor group of species, which occurs in summer-autumn with a peak in July.

== Distribution ==
The distribution area of the species extends from Southern Europe to southern Northern Europe. In Central Europe, with the exception of the higher mountain regions, it occurs frequently. The subspecies Bodiloides ictericus ictericus occurs in almost all of Europe and the Middle East, and the subspecies Bodiloides ictericus ghardimaouensis is found in Southern Europe, North Africa and the Middle East.

== Literature ==
- Edmund Reitter: Fauna Germanica, die Käfer des Deutschen Reiches III. Band, K.G.Lutz' Verlag, Stuttgart 1909 S. 309 als Bodilus nitidulus, nicht als Aberration von Esimus merdarius
- Gustav Jäger (Hrsg.): C. G. Calwer’s Käferbuch. K. Thienemanns, Stuttgart 1876, 3. Auflage S. 312 als Aphodius nitidulus, nicht als Lokalvarietät von Aphodius merdarius.
