= Pseudoteuchestes =

Scientific classification
- Kingdom: Animalia
- Phylum: Arthropoda
- Clade: Pancrustacea
- Class: Insecta
- Order: Coleoptera
- Suborder: Polyphaga
- Infraorder: Scarabaeiformia
- Family: Scarabaeidae
- Subfamily: Aphodiinae
- Tribe: Aphodiini
- Genus: Pseudoteuchestes; Dellacasa, 1986
- Species: P. schirparakensis

Binomial name
- Pseudoteuchestes schirparakensis (Petrovitz, 1955)

Synonyms
- Aphodius (Pseudoteuchestes) Dellacasa, 1986; Aphodius (Teuchestes) schirparakensis Petrovitz, 1955; Aphodius (Teuchestes) parabrachysomus Balthasar, 1955; Aphodius (Teuchestes) parabrachysomus postpositus Balthasar, 1955; Aphodius (Teuchestus) parabrachysomus khinjantanus Balthasar, 1955

Genus of beetles

Pseudoteuchestes is a genus of beetle of the family Scarabaeidae. It is monotypic, being represented by the single species, Pseudoteuchestes schirparakensis, which is found in Afghanistan and Kazakhstan.

== Description ==
Adults reach a length of about 5–8 mm (0.20–0.31 in). They have an oval-elongate, moderately convex, glabrous body. Males are dull, while females are shiny. They are blackish, normally with the elytra yellowish with blackish discal spots.
