= Pseudoahermodontus =

Scientific classification
- Kingdom: Animalia
- Phylum: Arthropoda
- Clade: Pancrustacea
- Class: Insecta
- Order: Coleoptera
- Suborder: Polyphaga
- Infraorder: Scarabaeiformia
- Family: Scarabaeidae
- Subfamily: Aphodiinae
- Tribe: Aphodiini
- Genus: Pseudoahermodontus; Dellacasa & Dellacasa, 1997
- Species: P. benesi

Binomial name
- Pseudoahermodontus benesi Dellacasa & Dellacasa, 1997

Genus of beetles

Pseudoahermodontus is a genus of beetle of the family Scarabaeidae. It is monotypic, being represented by the single species, Pseudoahermodontus benesi, which is found in China (Gansu, Sichuan).

== Description ==
Adults reach a length of about 5 mm (0.20 in). They have an oblong, stout, strongly convex, shiny, glabrous, black body, with the margin of the clypeus and the legs piceous. The antennal club is blackish.
