= Xenoheptaulacus =

Scientific classification
- Kingdom: Animalia
- Phylum: Arthropoda
- Clade: Pancrustacea
- Class: Insecta
- Order: Coleoptera
- Suborder: Polyphaga
- Infraorder: Scarabaeiformia
- Family: Scarabaeidae
- Subfamily: Aphodiinae
- Tribe: Aphodiini
- Genus: Xenoheptaulacus; Hinton, 1934
- Species: X. tricostatus

Binomial name
- Xenoheptaulacus tricostatus (Harold, 1869)

Synonyms
- Oxyomus tricostatus Harold, 1869; Xenoheptaulacus carinator Hinton, 1934; Oxyomus sulcipennis Dejean, 1833

Genus of beetles

Xenoheptaulacus is a genus of beetle of the family Scarabaeidae. It is monotypic, being represented by the single species, Xenoheptaulacus tricostatus, which is found in Colombia, Panama and Venezuela.

== Description ==
Adults reach a length of about 3.5–4 mm (0.14–0.16 in). They have an oblong, feebly convex, moderately shiny, testaceous-reddish body. The head and pronotum are pubescent.
