= Microteuchestes =

Scientific classification
- Kingdom: Animalia
- Phylum: Arthropoda
- Clade: Pancrustacea
- Class: Insecta
- Order: Coleoptera
- Suborder: Polyphaga
- Infraorder: Scarabaeiformia
- Family: Scarabaeidae
- Subfamily: Aphodiinae
- Tribe: Aphodiini
- Genus: Microteuchestes; Landin, 1974
- Species: M. brusewitzi

Binomial name
- Microteuchestes brusewitzi (Landin, 1974)

Synonyms
- Colobopterus (Microteuchestes) Landin, 1974; Colobopterus (Microteuchestes) brusewitzi Landin, 1974

Genus of beetles

Microteuchestes is a genus of beetle of the family Scarabaeidae. It is monotypic, being represented by the single species, Microteuchestes brusewitzi, which is found in Ethiopia, Ivory Coast and South Africa.

== Description ==
Adults reach a length of about 3–4 mm (0.12–0.16 in). They have a short, stout, strongly convex, shiny, glabrous, black body, with the antennal club and legs brownish.
