= Bodiloides =

Scientific classification
- Kingdom: Animalia
- Phylum: Arthropoda
- Clade: Pancrustacea
- Class: Insecta
- Order: Coleoptera
- Suborder: Polyphaga
- Infraorder: Scarabaeiformia
- Family: Scarabaeidae
- Subfamily: Aphodiinae
- Tribe: Aphodiini
- Genus: Bodiloides; Dellacasa & Dellacasa, 2005

Genus of beetles

Bodiloides is a genus of beetles of the family Scarabaeidae.

== Species ==
- Bodiloides asiricus (Pittino, 1984)
- Bodiloides ictericus (Laicharting, 1781)
