= Nipponaphodius =

Scientific classification
- Kingdom: Animalia
- Phylum: Arthropoda
- Clade: Pancrustacea
- Class: Insecta
- Order: Coleoptera
- Suborder: Polyphaga
- Infraorder: Scarabaeiformia
- Family: Scarabaeidae
- Subfamily: Aphodiinae
- Tribe: Aphodiini
- Genus: Nipponaphodius; Nakane, 1959
- Species: N. gotoi

Binomial name
- Nipponaphodius gotoi (Nomura & Nakane, 1951)

Synonyms
- Aphodius (Nipponaphodius) Nakane, 1959; Aphodius (Tristaphodius) gotoi Nomura & Nakane, 1951

Genus of beetles

Nipponaphodius is a genus of beetle of the family Scarabaeidae. It is monotypic, being represented by the single species, Nipponaphodius gotoi, which is found in Japan.

== Description ==
Adults reach a length of about 5 mm (0.20 in). They have an oblong, convex, sericeous body, with very short hairs. The are brown-blackish, with the disc of the pronotum brown-reddish.
