= Otophorus =

Scientific classification
- Kingdom: Animalia
- Phylum: Arthropoda
- Clade: Pancrustacea
- Class: Insecta
- Order: Coleoptera
- Suborder: Polyphaga
- Infraorder: Scarabaeiformia
- Family: Scarabaeidae
- Subfamily: Aphodiinae
- Tribe: Aphodiini
- Genus: Otophorus; Mulsant, 1842
- Species: O. haemorrhoidalis

Binomial name
- Otophorus haemorrhoidalis (Linnaeus, 1758)

Synonyms
- Scarabaeus haemorrhoidalis Linnaeus, 1758; Otophorus haemorrhoidalis totoniger Dellacasa & Dellacasa, 2005; Aphodius (Otophorus) haemorrhoidalis circumdatus Dellacasa, 1983; Aphodius haemorrhoidalis crudus Schmidt, 1917; Aphodius triplagiatus Harold, 1862; Otophorus haemorrhoidalis humeralis Mulsant, 1842; Otophorus haemorrhoidalis rubidus Mulsant, 1842; Scarabaeus bimaculatus Kugelann, 1792; Scarabaeus sanguinolentus Herbst, 1783

Genus of beetles

Otophorus is a genus of beetle of the family Scarabaeidae. It is monotypic, being represented by the single species, Otophorus haemorrhoidalis, which has a wide distribution in the Holarctic region and is also found in Mexico.

== Description ==
Adults reach a length of about 4–5 mm (0.16–0.20 in). They have a short, strongly convex, moderately shiny, nearly glabrous body. They are blackish, although the elytra are sometimes reddish apically or have a small reddish humeral spot. The elytra might even be blackish apically with some reddish spots at the shoulder, or entirely dark reddish.

== Distribution ==
Palaearctic: Albania, Algeria, Armenia, Austria, Azerbaijan, Belarus, Belgium, Bosnia and Herzegovina, Bulgaria, China (Ningxia, Xinjiang, Xizang), Croatia, the Czech Republic, Denmark, Estonia, Finland, France, Georgia, Germany, Great Britain, Greece, Hungary, Italy, Japan, Kazakhstan, Korea, Kosovo, Kyrgyzstan, Latvia, Lithuania, Luxembourg, Mongolia, Morocco, the Netherlands, Poland, Portugal, Slovakia, Montenegro, Romania, the Russian Far East, Serbia, Siberia, Slovenia, Spain, Sweden, Switzerland, Tajikistan, Turkey, Ukraine, Uzbekistan. Nearctic: Canada (Alberta, British Columbia, Manitoba, New Brunswick, Newfoundland, Nova Scotia, Ontario, Quebec, Saskatchewan), the United States (California, Colorado, Florida, Iowa, Maryland, New Mexico, North Dakota, South Dakota, Texas, Wisconsin). Neotropical: Mexico (Chihuahua, Coahuila, Durango, Nuevo León).
