= Sussorca =

Scientific classification
- Kingdom: Animalia
- Phylum: Arthropoda
- Clade: Pancrustacea
- Class: Insecta
- Order: Coleoptera
- Suborder: Polyphaga
- Infraorder: Scarabaeiformia
- Family: Scarabaeidae
- Subfamily: Aphodiinae
- Tribe: Aphodiini
- Genus: Sussorca; Paulian, 1954
- Species: S. lusingae

Binomial name
- Sussorca lusingae (Paulian, 1954)

Synonyms
- Aphodius (Sussorca) Paulian, 1954; Acrossus (Sussorca) lusingae Paulian, 1954

Genus of beetles

Sussorca is a genus of beetle of the family Scarabaeidae. It is monotypic, being represented by the single species, Sussorca lusingae, which is found in the Democratic Republic of the Congo.

== Description ==
Adults reach a length of about 8–9 mm (0.31–0.35 in). They have an oval, moderately convex, sericeous body. The sides of the pronotum and the odd elytral interstices have tiny hairs. They are dark orange, with a median spot on the head and the elytra blackish.
