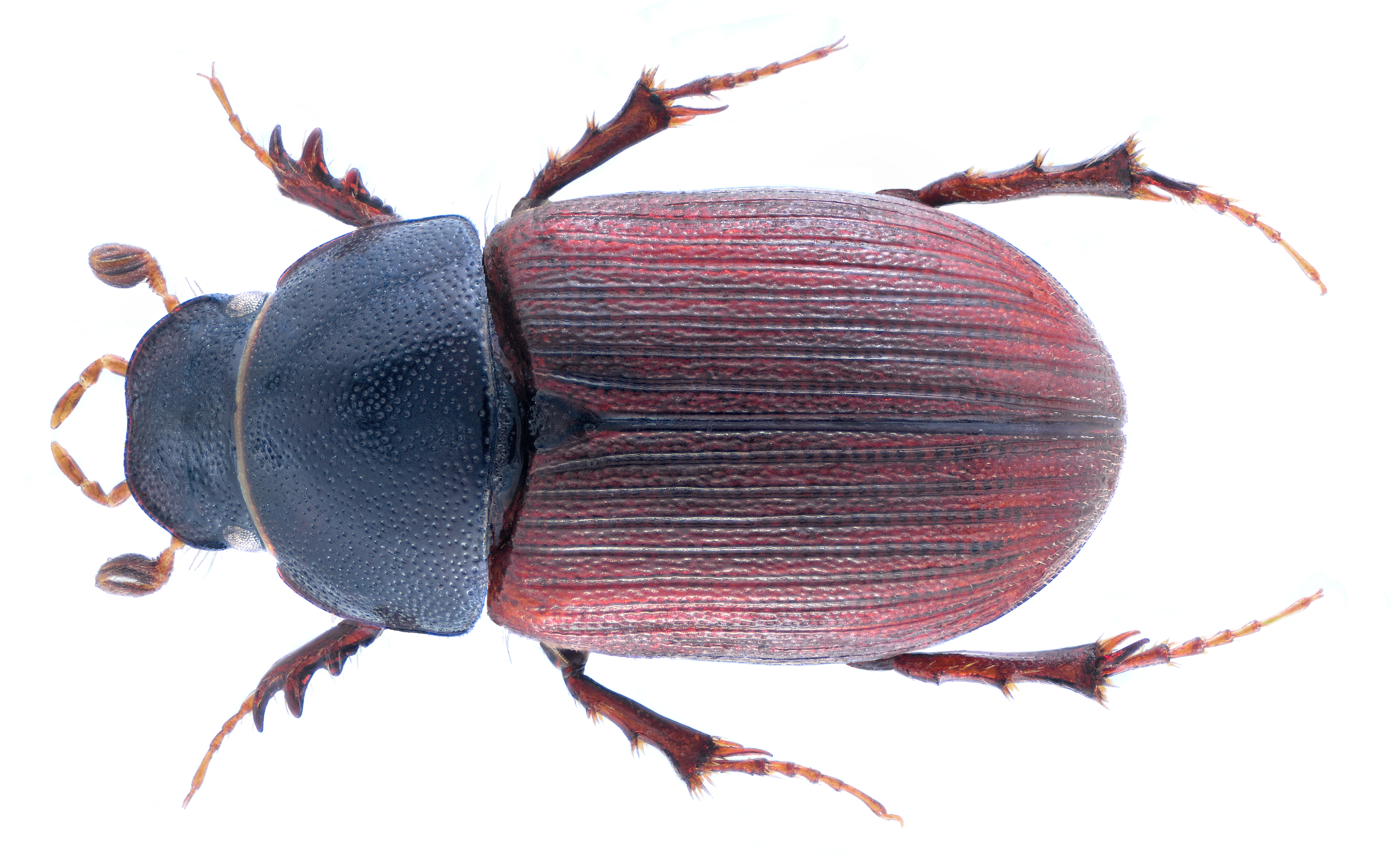
- Sigorus porcus, England

Scientific classification
- Kingdom: Animalia
- Phylum: Arthropoda
- Clade: Pancrustacea
- Class: Insecta
- Order: Coleoptera
- Suborder: Polyphaga
- Infraorder: Scarabaeiformia
- Family: Scarabaeidae
- Subfamily: Aphodiinae
- Tribe: Aphodiini
- Genus: Sigorus; Mulsant & Rey, 1870
- Species: S. porcus

Binomial name
- Sigorus porcus (Fabricius, 1792)

Synonyms
- Aphodius (Sigorus) Mulsant & Rey, 1870; Scarabaeus porcus Fabricius, 1792; Aphodius porcus; Aphodius porcus haemorrhoideus Mulsant, 1842; Aphodius fulvicrus Stephens, 1830; Scarabaeus ruficrus Marsham, 1802; Scarabaeus turpis Marsham, 1802; Scarabaeus anachoreta Creutzer, 1796

= Sigorus =

Genus of beetles

Sigorus is a genus of beetle of the family Scarabaeidae. It is monotypic, being represented by the single species, Sigorus porcus, the mahogany ridgeback scarab, which is found in Austria, Belgium, Bosnia and Herzegovina, Croatia, the Czech Republic, Denmark, Estonia, Finland, France, Georgia, Germany, Great Britain, Greece (Crete), Hungary, Ireland, Italy, Lithuania, the Netherlands, Norway, Poland, Portugal, Romania, Spain, Sweden, Switzerland, Turkey and Ukraine.

== Description ==
Adults reach a length of about 4–6 mm (0.16–0.24 in). They have an oblong, convex, rather shiny, nearly glabrous, blackish body, with the elytra vinaceous.

== Taxonomy ==
This species was formerly a member of the genus Aphodius.
