= Trichaphodiellus =

Scientific classification
- Kingdom: Animalia
- Phylum: Arthropoda
- Clade: Pancrustacea
- Class: Insecta
- Order: Coleoptera
- Suborder: Polyphaga
- Infraorder: Scarabaeiformia
- Family: Scarabaeidae
- Subfamily: Aphodiinae
- Tribe: Aphodiini
- Genus: Trichaphodiellus; Schmidt, 1914
- Species: T. brasiliensis

Binomial name
- Trichaphodiellus brasiliensis (Laporte, 1840)

Synonyms
- Aphodius brasiliensis Laporte, 1840; Aphodius (Nialus) excellens Endrödi, 1964; Aphodius caliginosus Dejean, 1833; Aphodius nubilus Illiger, 1833; Aphodius submaculatus Sturm, 1826

Genus of beetles

Trichaphodiellus is a genus of beetle of the family Scarabaeidae. It is monotypic, being represented by the single species, Trichaphodiellus brasiliensis, which is found in Bolivia, Brazil (Acre, Amazonas, Espírito Santo, Mato Grosso, Mato Grosso do Sul, Minas Gerais, Pará, Paraná, Paraíba, Rio de Janeiro, São Paulo, Sergipe), Colombia, Ecuador, Mexico, Peru, Suriname and Venezuela.

== Description ==
Adults reach a length of about 6–8 mm (0.24–0.31 in). The body is oblong and dark testaceous. The head has small and sparse punctures and the clypeus is sinuate medially, with a medial tubercle anterior to the frontoclypeal suture. The pronotum has sparse punctation, with punctures of two sizes and without a posterior marginal line. The dorsal surface of the protibia has dense punctation.

== Life history ==
Specimens have been collected at altitudes ranging from 33 to 1850 metres. They are attracted to equine, bovine, Tapirus and human feces.
