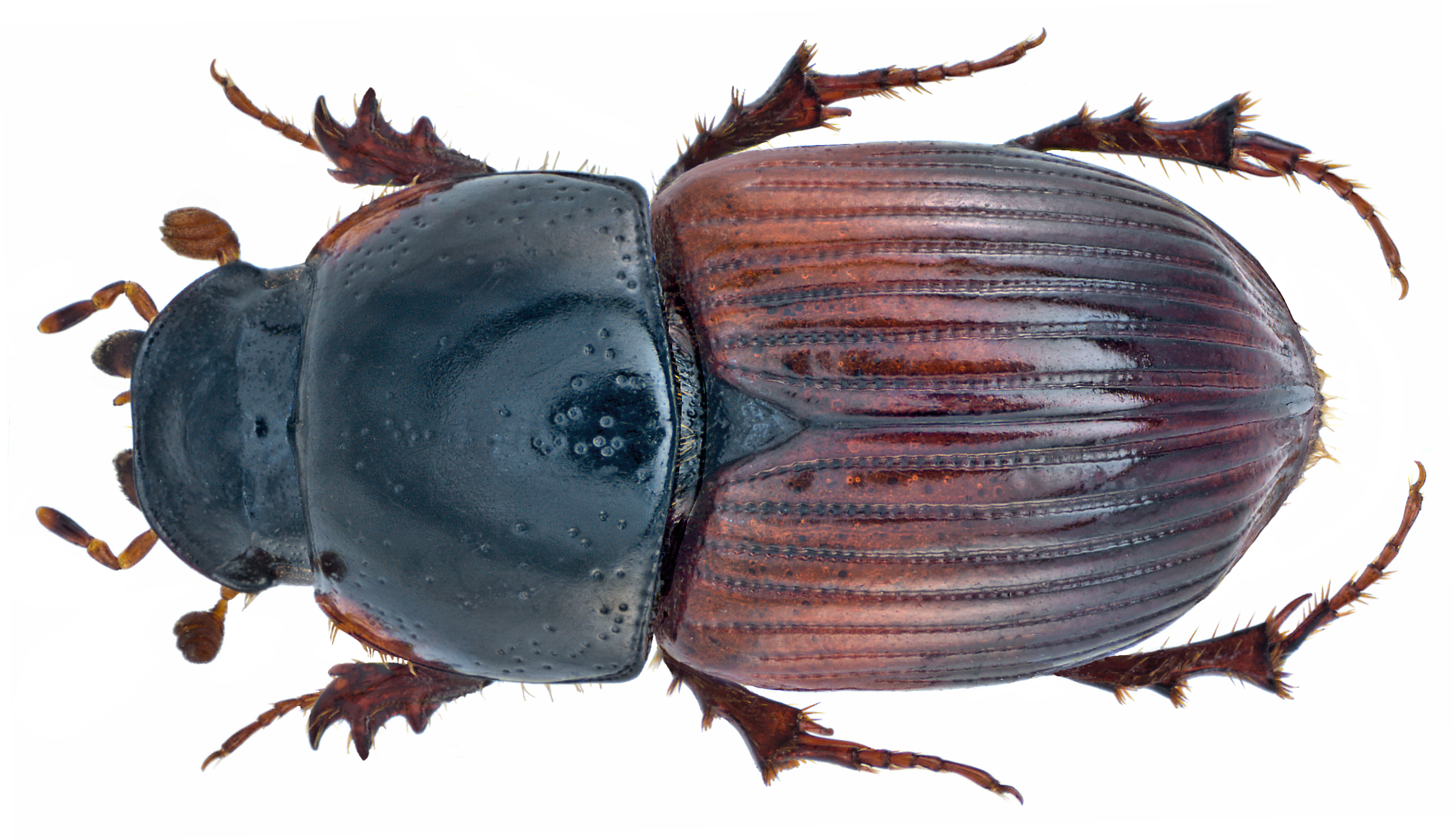

Scientific classification
- Kingdom: Animalia
- Phylum: Arthropoda
- Clade: Pancrustacea
- Class: Insecta
- Order: Coleoptera
- Suborder: Polyphaga
- Infraorder: Scarabaeiformia
- Family: Scarabaeidae
- Subfamily: Aphodiinae
- Tribe: Aphodiini
- Genus: Rhodaphodius; Ádám, 1994
- Species: R. foetens

Binomial name
- Rhodaphodius foetens (Fabricius, 1787)

Synonyms
- Scarabaeus foetens Fabricius, 1787; Aphodius fimetarius conjugatulus Strand & Gulbis, 1957; Aphodius foetens obscuriellus Schmidt, 1917; Aphodus pseudanalis Strand, 1917; Aphodius foetens hypocastaneus Bouskell, 1901; Aphodius foetens limbatus Dalla Torre, 1879; Aphodius rufiventris Preller, 1862; Aphodius analis Gistel, 1857; Aphodius foetens fuscipes Mulsant, 1842; Aphodius foetens nigricollis Mulsant, 1842; Aphodius foetens sanguinipennis Mulsant, 1842; Aphodius aestivalis Stephens, 1839; Aphodius ochraceus Stephens, 1830; Scarabaeus vaccinarius Herbst, 1789

= Rhodaphodius =

Genus of beetles

Rhodaphodius is a genus of beetle of the family Scarabaeidae. It is monotypic, being represented by the single species, Rhodaphodius foetens, which is found in Armenia, Austria, Azerbaijan, Belarus, Belgium, Bosnia Herzegovina, China (Xinjiang), Croatia, the Czech Republic, Denmark, Estonia, Finland, France, Georgia, Germany, Great Britain, Greece, Hungary, Ireland, Israel, Italy, Kazakhstan, Kyrgyzstan, Latvia, Lithuania, Macedonia, Mongolia, Morocco, Norway, Poland, Romania, Russia, Serbia, Slovakia, Slovenia, Spain, Sweden, Switzerland, Turkey, Ukraine and Uzbekistan.

== Description ==
Adults reach a length of about 6–9 mm (0.24–0.35 in). They have a suboval, convex, shiny, glabrous body. The head and pronotum are black, the latter with the fore angles reddish. The elytra are dark reddish and the abdomen is pale testaceous. The antennae are reddish with a paler club and the legs are reddish or blackish. In some specimens, the elytra are completely piceous.

== Taxonomy ==
This species was formerly a member of the genus Aphodius.
