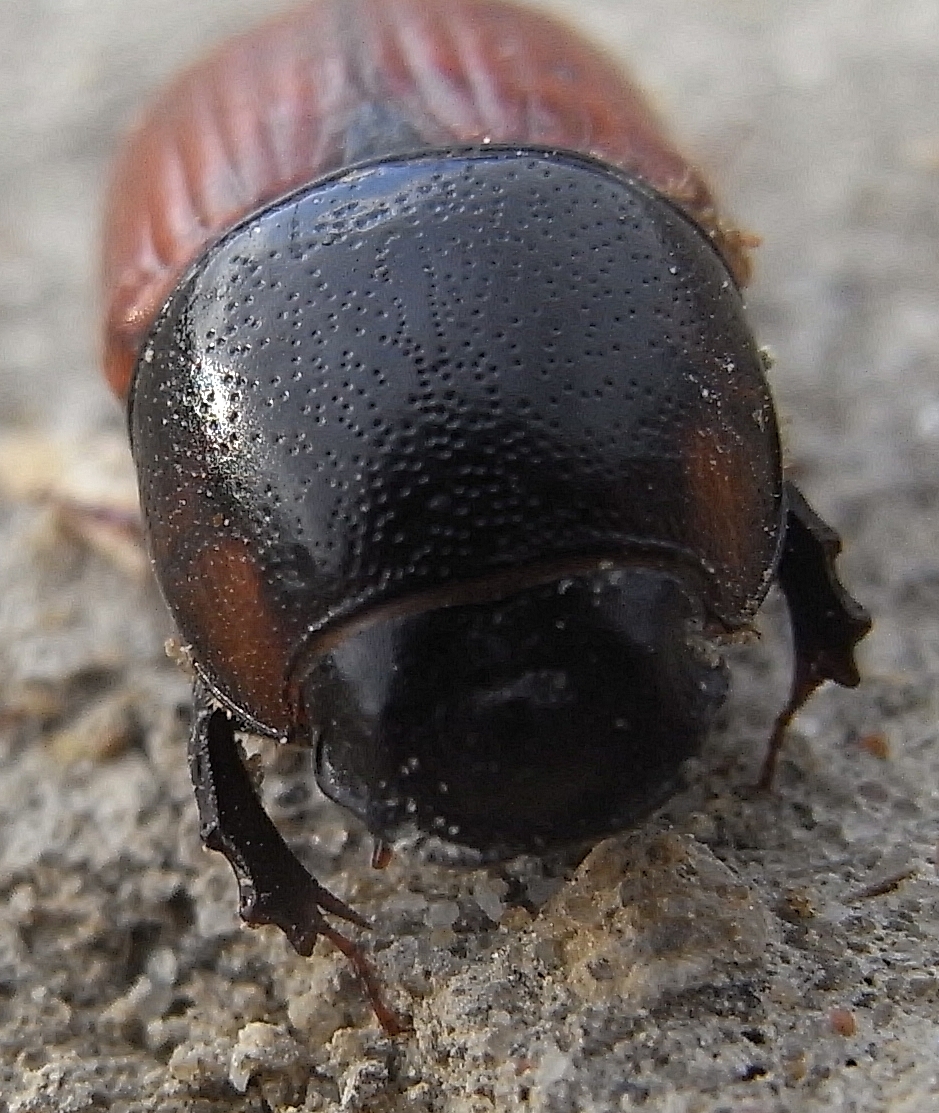

Scientific classification
- Kingdom: Animalia
- Phylum: Arthropoda
- Clade: Pancrustacea
- Class: Insecta
- Order: Coleoptera
- Suborder: Polyphaga
- Infraorder: Scarabaeiformia
- Family: Scarabaeidae
- Subfamily: Aphodiinae
- Tribe: Aphodiini
- Genus: Coprimorphus; Mulsant, 1842
- Species: C. scrutator

Binomial name
- Coprimorphus scrutator (Herbst, 1789)

Synonyms
- Scarabaeus scrutator Herbst, 1789; Aphodius (Coprimorphus) scrutator angulatus Dalla Torre, 1879; Aphodius (Coprimorphus) scrutator angustemarginatus Dalla Torre, 1879; Aphodius (Coprimorphus) scrutator latemarginatus Dalla Torre, 1879; Aphodius (Coprimorphus) scrutator tristissimus Dalla Torre, 1879; Aphodius scrutator aequinoctialis Harold, 1861; Aphodius capybara Gistel, 1857; Coprimorphus scrutator brunnipes Mulsant, 1842; Coprimorphus scrutator nigricollis Mulsant, 1842; Coprimorphus scrutator submaculatus Mulsant, 1842; Scarabaeus brevicornis Schrank, 1789; Scarabaeus rubidus Olivier, 1789

= Coprimorphus =

Genus of beetles

Coprimorphus is a genus of beetle of the family Scarabaeidae. It is monotypic, being represented by the single species, Coprimorphus scrutator, which is found in Armenia, Austria, the Azores, Belgium, Bosnia and Herzegovina, Bulgaria, the Canary Islands, Croatia, the Czech Republic, France, Georgia, Germany, Great Britain, Greece, Hungary, Iran, Italy, Macedonia, Moldova, Montenegro, Poland, Portugal, Romania, Russia, Serbia, Slovakia, Slovenia, Spain, Switzerland, Turkey and Ukraine.

== Description ==
Adults reach a length of about 10–15 mm (0.39–0.59 in). They have an oblong-elongate, parallel-sided, longitudinally flattened, moderately shiny, glabrous body. The head and pronotum are blackish, the pronotum with reddish spots. The elytra are usually red, but sometimes blackish. The abdomen is pale red.
