= Chittius =

Scientific classification
- Kingdom: Animalia
- Phylum: Arthropoda
- Clade: Pancrustacea
- Class: Insecta
- Order: Coleoptera
- Suborder: Polyphaga
- Infraorder: Scarabaeiformia
- Family: Scarabaeidae
- Subfamily: Aphodiinae
- Tribe: Aphodiini
- Genus: Chittius; Tarasov, 2008
- Species: C. anatolicus

Binomial name
- Chittius anatolicus (Petrovitz, 1963)

Synonyms
- Aphodius (Amidorus) anatolicus Petrovitz, 1963

Genus of beetles

Chittius is a genus of beetle of the family Scarabaeidae. It is monotypic, being represented by the single species, Chittius anatolicus, which is found in southern Turkey.

== Description ==
Adults reach a length of about 7–8 mm (0.28–0.31 in). They have an oval, rather convex, black body. The elytra are nearly glabrous and black, but reddish apically.
