= Oxycorythus =

Scientific classification
- Kingdom: Animalia
- Phylum: Arthropoda
- Clade: Pancrustacea
- Class: Insecta
- Order: Coleoptera
- Suborder: Polyphaga
- Infraorder: Scarabaeiformia
- Family: Scarabaeidae
- Subfamily: Aphodiinae
- Tribe: Aphodiini
- Genus: Oxycorythus; Solsky, 1876
- Species: O. morawitzi

Binomial name
- Oxycorythus morawitzi Solsky, 1876

Synonyms
- Oxycorythus solskyi Wilkins, 1886

Genus of beetles

Oxycorythus is a genus of beetle of the family Scarabaeidae. It is monotypic, being represented by the single species, Oxycorythus morawitzi, which is found in Kyrgyzstan, Tajikistan, Turkmenistan and Uzbekistan.

== Description ==
Adults reach a length of about 3.5–4.5 mm (0.14–0.18 in). They have an elongate, convex, subparallel-sided, sericeous, densely and shortly pubescent body. Males are blackish, with the antennae blackish with a brownish club. Females are blackish, with the clypeus, pronotum and apex of the elytra reddish.
