= Pseudopodotenus =

Scientific classification
- Kingdom: Animalia
- Phylum: Arthropoda
- Clade: Pancrustacea
- Class: Insecta
- Order: Coleoptera
- Suborder: Polyphaga
- Infraorder: Scarabaeiformia
- Family: Scarabaeidae
- Subfamily: Aphodiinae
- Tribe: Aphodiini
- Genus: Pseudopodotenus; Dellacasa, 1990
- Species: P. fulviventris

Binomial name
- Pseudopodotenus fulviventris (Fairmaire & Germain, 1860)

Synonyms
- Aphodius (Pseudopodotenus) Dellacasa, 1990; Aphodius fulviventris Fairmaire & Germain, 1860

Genus of beetles

Pseudopodotenus is a genus of beetle of the family Scarabaeidae. It is monotypic, being represented by the single species, Pseudopodotenus fulviventris, which is found in Chile.

== Description ==
Adults reach a length of about 8–11 mm (0.31–0.43 in). They have an elongate, nearly flat, rather glabrous body. The head and pronotum are shiny, while the elytra are sericeous. They are blackish, with the antennae piceous, with a testaceous club. The abdomen is pale red.
