= Lindbergianus =

Scientific classification
- Kingdom: Animalia
- Phylum: Arthropoda
- Clade: Pancrustacea
- Class: Insecta
- Order: Coleoptera
- Suborder: Polyphaga
- Infraorder: Scarabaeiformia
- Family: Scarabaeidae
- Subfamily: Aphodiinae
- Tribe: Aphodiini
- Genus: Lindbergianus; Petrovitz, 1961
- Species: L. solitarius

Binomial name
- Lindbergianus solitarius (Petrovitz, 1961)

Synonyms
- Aphodius (Lindbergianus) Petrovitz, 1961; Aphodius (Lindbergianus) solitarius Petrovitz, 1961; Aphodius (Mendidius) pseudatricolor Nikritin, 1979

Genus of beetles

Lindbergianus is a genus of beetle of the family Scarabaeidae. It is monotypic, being represented by the single species, Lindbergianus solitarius, which is found in Afghanistan.

== Description ==
Adults reach a length of about 3.5–5 mm (0.14–0.20 in). They have a convex, subcylindrical, shiny, glabrous, blackish body, with the elytra reddish apically.
