= Sahlbergianus =

Scientific classification
- Kingdom: Animalia
- Phylum: Arthropoda
- Clade: Pancrustacea
- Class: Insecta
- Order: Coleoptera
- Suborder: Polyphaga
- Infraorder: Scarabaeiformia
- Family: Scarabaeidae
- Subfamily: Aphodiinae
- Tribe: Aphodiini
- Genus: Sahlbergianus; Dellacasa & Dellacasa, 2000
- Species: S. longissimus

Binomial name
- Sahlbergianus longissimus (Sahlberg, 1908)

Synonyms
- Aphodius (Erytus) longissimus Sahlberg, 1908

Genus of beetles

Sahlbergianus is a genus of beetle of the family Scarabaeidae. It is monotypic, being represented by the single species, Sahlbergianus longissimus, which is found in Egypt, Israel, Palestina and possibly Syria.

== Description ==
Adults reach a length of about 7–8 mm (0.28–0.31 in). They have an oblong, strongly shining, yellowish-brown body, with the frontal and elytral suture darkened.
