= Loraspis =

Scientific classification
- Kingdom: Animalia
- Phylum: Arthropoda
- Clade: Pancrustacea
- Class: Insecta
- Order: Coleoptera
- Suborder: Polyphaga
- Infraorder: Scarabaeiformia
- Family: Scarabaeidae
- Subfamily: Aphodiinae
- Tribe: Aphodiini
- Genus: Loraspis; Mulsant & Rey, 1870
- Species: L. frater

Binomial name
- Loraspis frater (Mulsant & Rey, 1870)

Synonyms
- Aphodius (Loraspis) Mulsant & Rey, 1870; Aphodius frater Mulsant & Rey, 1870; Aphodius (Ammoecius) pannonicus Petrovitz, 1961; Aphodius (Loraspis) sulcatus erythropterus Orbigny, 1896

Genus of beetles

Loraspis is a genus of beetle of the family Scarabaeidae. It is monotypic, being represented by the single species, Loraspis frater, which is found in Bulgaria, China (Xinjiang), the Czech Republic, Georgia, Hungary, Iran, Kazakhstan, Kyrgyzstan, Russia, Spain, Sweden and Ukraine.

== Description ==
Adults reach a length of about 5–6 mm (0.20–0.24 in). They have a suboval, strongly convex, shiny, glabrous, blackish body, with the margin of the clypeus and the legs brownish. The sides of the pronotum and elytra are sometimes reddish.
