= Symphodon =

Scientific classification
- Kingdom: Animalia
- Phylum: Arthropoda
- Clade: Pancrustacea
- Class: Insecta
- Order: Coleoptera
- Suborder: Polyphaga
- Infraorder: Scarabaeiformia
- Family: Scarabaeidae
- Subfamily: Aphodiinae
- Tribe: Aphodiini
- Genus: Symphodon; Schmidt, 1914
- Species: S. anomalum

Binomial name
- Symphodon anomalum (Harold, 1874)

Synonyms
- Aphodius (Symphodon) Schmidt, 1914; Aphodius anomalus Harold, 1874

Genus of beetles

Symphodon is a genus of beetle of the family Scarabaeidae. It is monotypic, being represented by the single species, Symphodon anomalum, which is found in Chile.

== Description ==
Adults reach a length of about 6–8 mm (0.24–0.31 in). They have a strongly elongate, moderately convex, weakly shiny body, with some short hairs. They are dirty testaceous, with the sides of the pronotum and apex of the elytra yellowish. The antennae and legs are brownish.
