= Hornietus =

Scientific classification
- Kingdom: Animalia
- Phylum: Arthropoda
- Class: Insecta
- Order: Coleoptera
- Suborder: Polyphaga
- Infraorder: Scarabaeiformia
- Family: Scarabaeidae
- Subfamily: Aphodiinae
- Tribe: Aphodiini
- Genus: Hornietus
- Species: H. ventralis

Binomial name
- Hornietus ventralis Stebnicka, 2000

Genus of beetles

Hornietus is a monotypic genus of aphodiine dung beetles in the family Scarabaeidae, the sole genus of the tribe Hornietiini. The single described species in the genus, Hornietus ventralis, is found in North America.
