= Pubinus =

Scientific classification
- Kingdom: Animalia
- Phylum: Arthropoda
- Clade: Pancrustacea
- Class: Insecta
- Order: Coleoptera
- Suborder: Polyphaga
- Infraorder: Scarabaeiformia
- Family: Scarabaeidae
- Subfamily: Aphodiinae
- Tribe: Aphodiini
- Genus: Pubinus; Mulsant & Rey, 1870
- Species: P. tomentosus

Binomial name
- Pubinus tomentosus (Müller, 1776)

Synonyms
- Scarabaeus tomentosus Müller, 1776; Aphodius (Pubinus) tomentosus modicus Semenov, 1899; Aphodius (Biralus) tunicatus Reitter, 1894; Aphodius melanarius Sturm, 1826; Aphodius immundus Fabricius, 1801; Scarabaeus hirtellus Baczko, 1800; Scarabaeus lutarius Fabricius, 1792

Genus of beetles

Pubinus is a genus of beetle of the family Scarabaeidae. It is monotypic, being represented by the single species, Pubinus tomentosus, which is found in Austria, Belarus, Denmark, Estonia, Finland, Germany, Italy, Kazakhstan, Latvia, Lithuania, the Netherlands, Poland, Russia (including Siberia), Sweden, Switzerland and Ukraine.

== Description ==
Adults reach a length of about 5–6.5 mm (0.20–0.26 in). They have an oblong-oval, feebly convex, rather dull, pubescent, blackish body. The elytra are dark reddish, but darker on the disc.
