= Drepanocanthoides =

Scientific classification
- Kingdom: Animalia
- Phylum: Arthropoda
- Clade: Pancrustacea
- Class: Insecta
- Order: Coleoptera
- Suborder: Polyphaga
- Infraorder: Scarabaeiformia
- Family: Scarabaeidae
- Subfamily: Aphodiinae
- Tribe: Aphodiini
- Genus: Drepanocanthoides; Schmidt, 1914
- Species: D. walshii

Binomial name
- Drepanocanthoides walshii (Horn, 1870)

Synonyms
- Aphodius (Drepanocanthoides) Schmidt, 1914; Aphodius walshii Horn, 1870

Genus of beetles

Drepanocanthoides is a genus of beetle of the family Scarabaeidae. It is monotypic, being represented by the single species, Drepanocanthoides walshii, which is found in Canada (Alberta, Manitoba, Saskatchewan) and the United States (Colorado, Illinois, Indiana, Iowa, Kansas, Nebraska, North Dakota, South Dakota, Wisconsin).

== Description ==
Adults reach a length of about 5–6 mm (0.20–0.24 in). They have a moderately elongate, convex body, with the head and pronotum shiny and the elytra alutaceous and posteriorly pubescent. The head and pronotum are piceous, the latter with yellowish sides. The elytra are brownish, with the base and sides dull yellow. The antennae are testaceous with a blackish club and the legs are yellowish.
