= Gordonius =

Scientific classification
- Kingdom: Animalia
- Phylum: Arthropoda
- Clade: Pancrustacea
- Class: Insecta
- Order: Coleoptera
- Suborder: Polyphaga
- Infraorder: Scarabaeiformia
- Family: Scarabaeidae
- Subfamily: Aphodiinae
- Tribe: Aphodiini
- Genus: Gordonius; Skelley, Dellacasa & Dellacasa, 2009
- Species: G. rhinocerillus

Binomial name
- Gordonius rhinocerillus Skelley, Dellacasa & Dellacasa, 2009

Genus of beetles

Gordonius is a genus of beetle of the family Scarabaeidae. It is monotypic, being represented by the single species, Gordonius rhinocerillus, which is found in Colombia.

== Description ==
Adults reach a length of about 5.5–6 mm (0.22–0.24 in). They have an oblong, strongly convex, moderately shining, glabrous, yellowish brown body, with the head, most of the pronotum and a discal spot on the elytra brown, while the legs and club of the antennae are reddish-brown.

== Etymology ==
The genus is named in honour of American Coccinellidae and Aphodiinae specialist Robert D. Gordon. The species name refers to the horn of the males, which is similar to that of a rhinoceros.
