= Turanella =

Scientific classification
- Kingdom: Animalia
- Phylum: Arthropoda
- Clade: Pancrustacea
- Class: Insecta
- Order: Coleoptera
- Suborder: Polyphaga
- Infraorder: Scarabaeiformia
- Family: Scarabaeidae
- Subfamily: Aphodiinae
- Tribe: Aphodiini
- Genus: Turanella; Semenov, 1905
- Species: T. latevittis

Binomial name
- Turanella latevittis (Reitter, 1887)

Synonyms
- Isochirus Reitter, 1892; Aphodius latevittis Reitter, 1887

Genus of beetles

Turanella is a genus of beetle of the family Scarabaeidae. It is monotypic, being represented by the single species, Turanella latevittis, which is found in Armenia, Azerbaijan, China (Xinjiang), Iran, Kazakhstan, Kyrgyzstan, Russia, Tajikistan, Turkmenistan and Uzbekistan.

== Description ==
Adults reach a length of about 2.5–4 mm (0.098–0.157 in). They have an elongate, convex, moderately shiny, glabrous, blackish body, with the margin of the clypeus, antennae and legs reddish. The elytra have a testaceous discal spot.
