= Jalisco plumipes =

Scientific classification
- Kingdom: Animalia
- Phylum: Arthropoda
- Clade: Pancrustacea
- Class: Insecta
- Order: Coleoptera
- Suborder: Polyphaga
- Infraorder: Scarabaeiformia
- Family: Scarabaeidae
- Tribe: Aphodiini
- Subtribe: Aphodiina
- Genus: Jalisco; Gordon & Dellacasa, 2003
- Species: J. plumipes

Binomial name
- Jalisco plumipes Gordon & Dellacasa, 2003

Genus of beetles

Jalisco is a genus of dung beetles in the subfamily Aphodiinae. There is one described species, Jalisco plumipes known from Jalisco, Mexico.

== Description ==
Adults reach a length of about 4–4.5 mm (0.16–0.18 in). They have a short, oval, strongly convex, shiny, glabrous, chestnut-brown body, with the apex of the elytra paler. The legs are brownish and the club of the antennae is piceous.

== Etymology ==
The genus name refers to the Mexican state of Jalisco, while the name of the species refers to the peculiar tarsal pubescence that resembles a feather.
