= Pardalosus =

Scientific classification
- Kingdom: Animalia
- Phylum: Arthropoda
- Clade: Pancrustacea
- Class: Insecta
- Order: Coleoptera
- Suborder: Polyphaga
- Infraorder: Scarabaeiformia
- Family: Scarabaeidae
- Subfamily: Aphodiinae
- Tribe: Aphodiini
- Genus: Pardalosus; Gordon & Skelley, 2007

Type species
- Aphodius pardalis LeConte, 1857

Genus of North American dung beetles

Pardalosus is a genus of aphodiine dung beetles in the family Scarabaeidae. They are native to North America, with the greatest diversity on the western side of the continent. Although most species may be detritivores that do not associate strongly with dung, some species of Pardalosus are associated with rodents: P. neodistinctus is collected in association with prairie dogs, while P. sleveni is collected in association with pack rats.

== Species ==
- Pardalosus neodistinctus (Brown, 1928)
- Pardalosus pardalis (LeConte, 1857)
- Pardalosus pseudopardalis Gordon & Skelley, 2007
- Pardalosus pumilio (Schmidt, 1907)
- Pardalosus sayi (Gordon, 2006)
- Pardalosus serval (Say, 1835)
- Pardalosus slevini (Van Dyke, 1928)
