= Anomalurobius =

Scientific classification
- Kingdom: Animalia
- Phylum: Arthropoda
- Clade: Pancrustacea
- Class: Insecta
- Order: Coleoptera
- Suborder: Polyphaga
- Infraorder: Scarabaeiformia
- Family: Scarabaeidae
- Subfamily: Aphodiinae
- Tribe: Aphodiini
- Genus: Anomalurobius; Paulian, 1952
- Species: A. eburneus

Binomial name
- Anomalurobius eburneus Paulian, 1952

Genus of beetles

Anomalurobius is a genus of beetle of the family Scarabaeidae. It is monotypic, being represented by the single species, Anomalurobius eburneus, which is found in Ivory Coast.

== Description ==
Adults reach a length of about 4 mm (0.16 in). They have a shiny, very finely microreticulate, brownish-red body, but brownish-black anteriorly (except for the margins). The second elytral interstice is paler.

== Life history ==
The single known specimen of this species was discovered in a burrow of an Anomalurus species, located in a cavity of a decaying tree trunk.
