= Afrotrichonotulus =

Scientific classification
- Kingdom: Animalia
- Phylum: Arthropoda
- Clade: Pancrustacea
- Class: Insecta
- Order: Coleoptera
- Suborder: Polyphaga
- Infraorder: Scarabaeiformia
- Family: Scarabaeidae
- Subfamily: Aphodiinae
- Tribe: Aphodiini
- Genus: Afrotrichonotulus; Bordat, 2016

Genus of beetles

Afrotrichonotulus is a genus of beetles of the family Scarabaeidae.

== Species ==
- Afrotrichonotulus aethiopicus (Müller, 1942)
- Afrotrichonotulus niedobovae Bordat, 2016
