= Gonaphodius =

Scientific classification
- Kingdom: Animalia
- Phylum: Arthropoda
- Clade: Pancrustacea
- Class: Insecta
- Order: Coleoptera
- Suborder: Polyphaga
- Infraorder: Scarabaeiformia
- Family: Scarabaeidae
- Subfamily: Aphodiinae
- Tribe: Aphodiini
- Genus: Gonaphodius; Reitter, 1892
- Species: G. scoparius

Binomial name
- Gonaphodius scoparius (Harold, 1877)

Synonyms
- Aphodius (Gonaphodius) Reitter, 1892; Aphodius scoparius Harold, 1877; Aphodius (Acrossus) postangulus Reitter, 1887

Genus of beetles

Gonaphodius is a genus of beetle of the family Scarabaeidae. It is monotypic, being represented by the single species, Gonaphodius scoparius, which is found in China (Xizang), Mongolia, Russia (Russian Far East, Siberia) and Turkmenistan.

== Description ==
Adults reach a length of about 5.5–7 mm (0.22–0.28 in). They have a rather convex, shiny, glabrous and piceous body.
