= Nialosternus =

Scientific classification
- Kingdom: Animalia
- Phylum: Arthropoda
- Clade: Pancrustacea
- Class: Insecta
- Order: Coleoptera
- Suborder: Polyphaga
- Infraorder: Scarabaeiformia
- Family: Scarabaeidae
- Subfamily: Aphodiinae
- Tribe: Aphodiini
- Genus: Nialosternus; Hollande & Thérond, 1998
- Species: N. rendalli

Binomial name
- Nialosternus rendalli (Wollaston, 1867)

Synonyms
- Aphodius (Nialosternus) Hollande & Thérond, 1998; Aphodius rendalli Wollaston, 1867; Aphodius (Calamosternus) mothomimus Paulian, 1980; Aphodius (Mendidius) irakanus Petrovitz, 1965; Aphodius (Mendidius) tschadensis Petrovitz, 1963; Aphodius sitiphoides Orbigny, 1896

Genus of beetles

Nialosternus is a genus of beetle of the family Scarabaeidae. It is monotypic, being represented by the single species, Nialosternus rendalli, which is found in Algeria, the Azores, Iran, Iraq, Israel, Libya, Morocco, Oman, Qatar, Saudi Arabia, Syria, Tunisia, the United Arab Emirates, Yemen, Chad and Mauretania.

== Description ==
Adults reach a length of about 3–5 mm (0.12–0.20 in). They have an oval-elongate, stout, convex, rather shiny, glabrous, reddish-testaceous body. The margin of the clypeus, two lateral spots and the basal margin of the pronotum, as well as the elytral suture are brownish. The legs are reddish and the antennal club is yellowish.
