= Exaphodius =

Scientific classification
- Kingdom: Animalia
- Phylum: Arthropoda
- Clade: Pancrustacea
- Class: Insecta
- Order: Coleoptera
- Suborder: Polyphaga
- Infraorder: Scarabaeiformia
- Family: Scarabaeidae
- Subfamily: Aphodiinae
- Tribe: Aphodiini
- Genus: Exaphodius; Endrödi, 1960
- Species: E. excellens

Binomial name
- Exaphodius excellens Endrödi, 1960

Genus of beetles

Exaphodius is a genus of beetle of the family Scarabaeidae. It is monotypic, being represented by the single species, Exaphodius excellens, which is found in Ethiopia, the Democratic Republic of the Congo and Tanzania.

== Description ==
Adults reach a length of about 16–18 mm (0.63–0.71 in). They have a stout, convex, shiny and glabrous body. The elytra pubescent toward the apex. They are pale brownish, but the margin of the clypeus, sides of the pronotum and lateral margins of the elytra are even paler.
