= Parabodilus =

Scientific classification
- Kingdom: Animalia
- Phylum: Arthropoda
- Clade: Pancrustacea
- Class: Insecta
- Order: Coleoptera
- Suborder: Polyphaga
- Infraorder: Scarabaeiformia
- Family: Scarabaeidae
- Subfamily: Aphodiinae
- Tribe: Aphodiini
- Genus: Parabodilus; Hollande & Thérond, 1998
- Species: P. wollastoni

Binomial name
- Parabodilus wollastoni (Harold, 1862)

Synonyms
- Aphodius wollastoni Harold, 1862; Aphodius spinulosus Wollaston, 1862; Aphodius (Bodilus) iranicus althasar, 1946; Aphodius (Bodilus) wollastoni radjastanicus Petrovitz, 1962

Genus of beetles

Parabodilus is a genus of beetle of the family Scarabaeidae. It is monotypic, being represented by the single species, Parabodilus wollastoni, which is found in Algeria, the Canary Islands, Libya, Morocco, Tunisia, Egypt, Iran, Iraq, Israel, Jordan, Kuwait, Lebanon, Oman, Pakistan, Saudi Arabia, Syria, Turkmenistan, United Arab Emirates, Yemen and India (Rajasthan).

== Description ==
Adults reach a length of about 6–8 mm (0.24–0.31 in). They have an oblong, convex, moderately shiny, nearly glabrous, brown-reddish body, with the sides of the pronotum and elytra red-yellowish, the latter with dark suture. The legs are reddish-brown and the antennal club is testaceous.

== Subspecies ==
- Parabodilus wollastoni wollastoni (Algeria, Canary Islands, Egypt, Libya, Morocco, Tunisia)
- Parabodilus wollastoni iranicus (Balthasar, 1946) (Egypt, Iran, Iraq, Israel, Jordan, Kuwait, Lebanon, Oman, Pakistan, Saudi Arabia, Syria, Turkmenistan, United Arab Emirates, Yemen, India: Rajasthan)
