= Acanthaphodius =

Scientific classification
- Kingdom: Animalia
- Phylum: Arthropoda
- Clade: Pancrustacea
- Class: Insecta
- Order: Coleoptera
- Suborder: Polyphaga
- Infraorder: Scarabaeiformia
- Family: Scarabaeidae
- Subfamily: Aphodiinae
- Tribe: Aphodiini
- Genus: Acanthaphodius; Schmidt, 1909
- Species: A. bruchi

Binomial name
- Acanthaphodius bruchi Schmidt, 1909

Genus of beetles

Acanthaphodius is a genus of beetle of the family Scarabaeidae. It is monotypic, being represented by the single species, Acanthaphodius bruchi, which is found in south-western Argentina and Chile.

== Description ==
Adults reach a length of about 3–4 mm (0.12–0.16 in). They have an oblong, convex, shiny, nearly glabrous body. The head is piceous with reddish sides. The pronotum is piceous with the front angles and a basal spot reddish. The elytra are yellowish with numerous piceous spots.
