= Vladimirellus =

Scientific classification
- Kingdom: Animalia
- Phylum: Arthropoda
- Clade: Pancrustacea
- Class: Insecta
- Order: Coleoptera
- Suborder: Polyphaga
- Infraorder: Scarabaeiformia
- Family: Scarabaeidae
- Subfamily: Aphodiinae
- Tribe: Aphodiini
- Genus: Vladimirellus; Dellacasa, Dellacasa & Bordat, 2002
- Species: V. socors

Binomial name
- Vladimirellus socors (Balthasar, 1967)

Synonyms
- Aphodius (Ammoecius) socors Balthasar, 1967

Genus of beetles

Vladimirellus is a genus of beetle of the family Scarabaeidae. It is monotypic, being represented by the single species, Vladimirellus socors, which is found in the Russian Far East and Siberia.

== Description ==
Adults reach a length of about 4 mm (0.16 in). They have an oblong, stout, strongly convex, dull, glabrous, blackish body, with the margin of the clypeus and the legs dark brownish and the antennal club piceous.
