= Obaphodius =

Scientific classification
- Kingdom: Animalia
- Phylum: Arthropoda
- Clade: Pancrustacea
- Class: Insecta
- Order: Coleoptera
- Suborder: Polyphaga
- Infraorder: Scarabaeiformia
- Family: Scarabaeidae
- Subfamily: Aphodiinae
- Tribe: Aphodiini
- Genus: Obaphodius; Bordat, 1988
- Species: O. silvestris

Binomial name
- Obaphodius silvestris (Bordat, 1988)

Synonyms
- Aphodius (Obaphodius) Bordat, 1988; Aphodius (Obaphodius) silvestris Nomura & Nakane, 1951

Genus of beetles

Obaphodius is a genus of beetle of the family Scarabaeidae. It is monotypic, being represented by the single species, Obaphodius silvestris, which is found in South Africa (Eastern Cape).

== Description ==
Adults reach a length of about 4.2 mm (0.17 in). They have a stout, convex, quite shortly pubescent, shiny body (although the striae on the elytra are dull). They are brown-blackish, with the margin of the clypeus and the fore angles of the pronotum brown-reddish.
