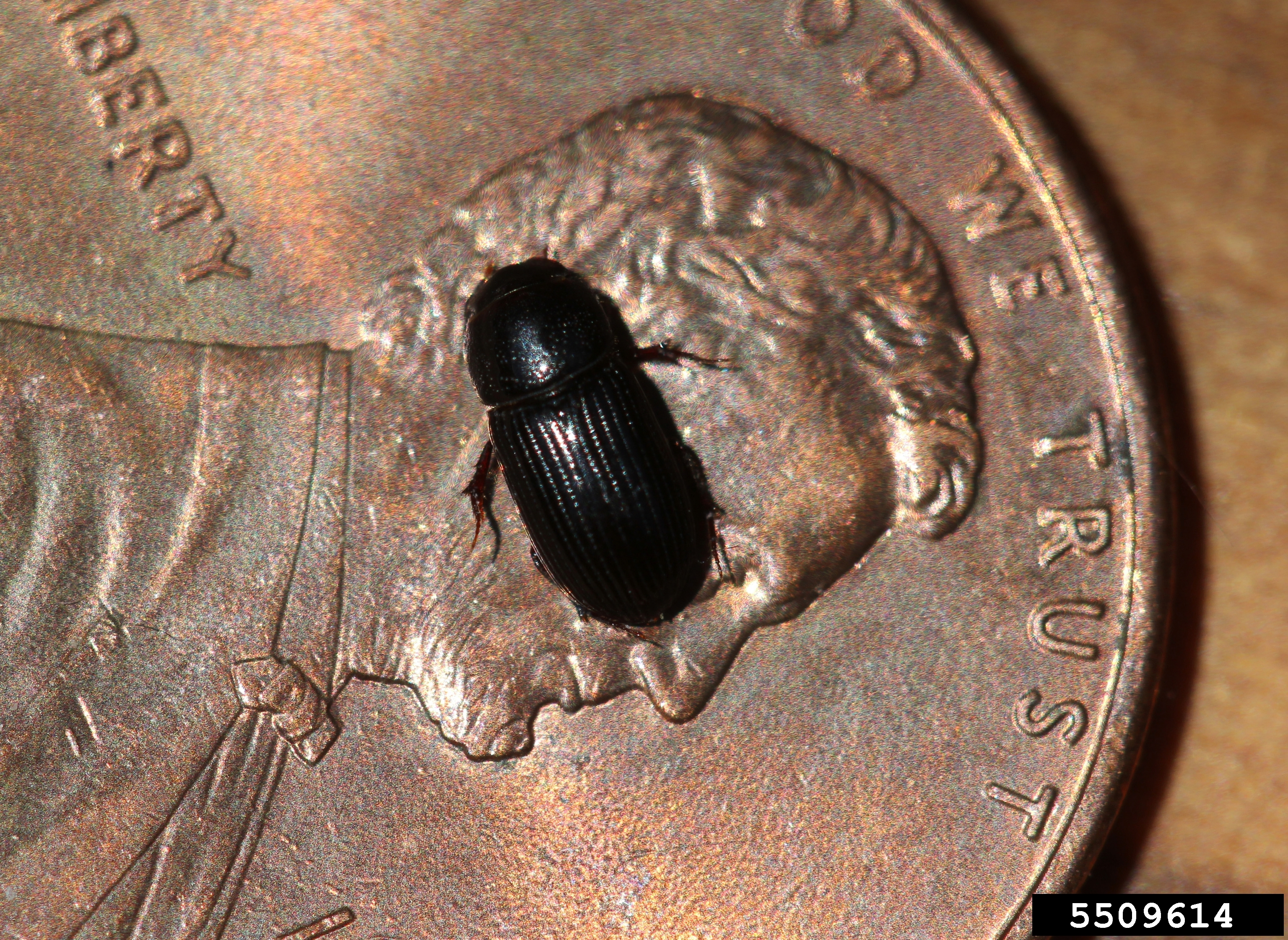

Scientific classification
- Kingdom: Animalia
- Phylum: Arthropoda
- Clade: Pancrustacea
- Class: Insecta
- Order: Coleoptera
- Suborder: Polyphaga
- Infraorder: Scarabaeiformia
- Family: Scarabaeidae
- Genus: Ataenius
- Species: A. spretulus

Binomial name
- Ataenius spretulus (Haldeman, 1848)

Synonyms
- Ataenius consors Fall, 1930; Ataenius falli Hinton, 1934; Aphodius spretulus Haldeman, 1848

= Ataenius spretulus =

Species of beetle

Ataenius spretulus, the black turfgrass ataenius or black fairway beetle, is a species of aphodiine dung beetle in the family Scarabaeidae. It is found in the United States (Alabama, Arkansas, California, Colorado, Connecticut, Delaware, Columbia, Florida, Georgia, Idaho, Illinois, Indiana, Iowa, Kansas, Kentucky, Louisiana, Maryland, Massachusetts, Michigan, Minnesota, Mississippi, Missouri, Nebraska, New Hampshire, New Jersey, New Mexico, New York, North Carolina, North Dakota, Ohio, Oklahoma, Pennsylvania, Rhode Island, South Carolina, South Dakota, Tennessee, Texas, Utah, Virginia, West Virginia, Wisconsin, Wyoming), Canada (Ontario, Quebec) and also in Portugal.

== Description ==
Adults reach a length of about 3.6–5.5 mm (0.14–0.22 in). They have an oblong, moderately shiny, black body, with the legs usually reddish-black.

== Life history ==
Specimens have been collected in cow dung, deer droppings, as well as in plant debris.
