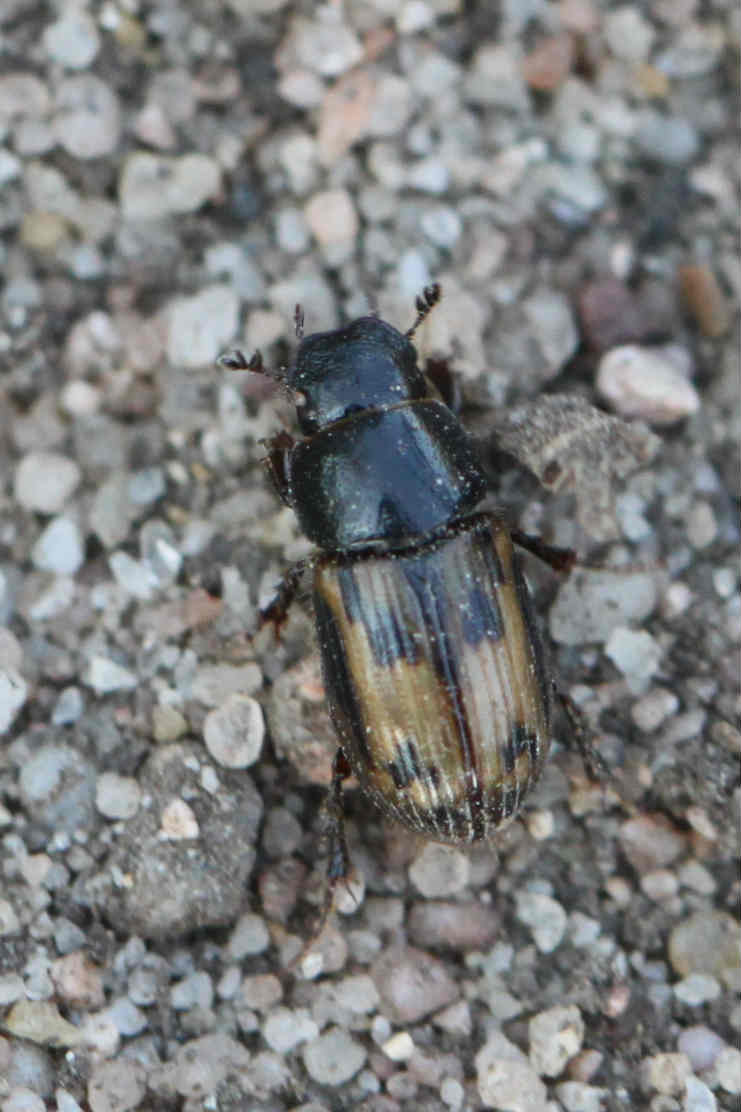
- Chilothorax distinctus, Germany

Scientific classification
- Kingdom: Animalia
- Phylum: Arthropoda
- Clade: Pancrustacea
- Class: Insecta
- Order: Coleoptera
- Suborder: Polyphaga
- Infraorder: Scarabaeiformia
- Family: Scarabaeidae
- Subfamily: Aphodiinae
- Tribe: Aphodiini; Leach, 1815

= Aphodiini =

Tribe of beetles

Aphodiini is a tribe of aphodiine dung beetles in the family Scarabaeidae. There are more than 250 genera and 2,200 described species in Aphodiini.

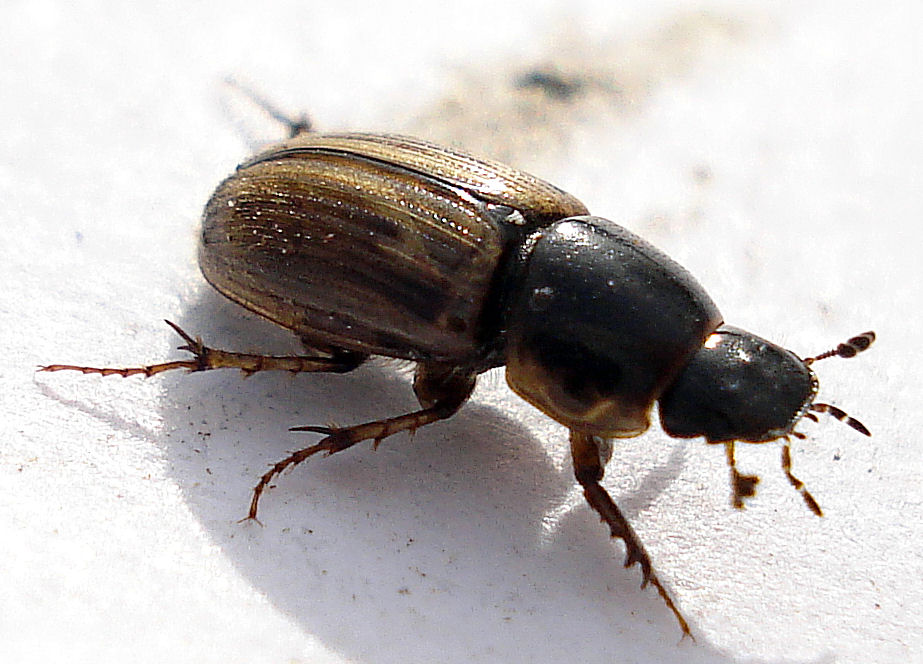
Nimbussp, England

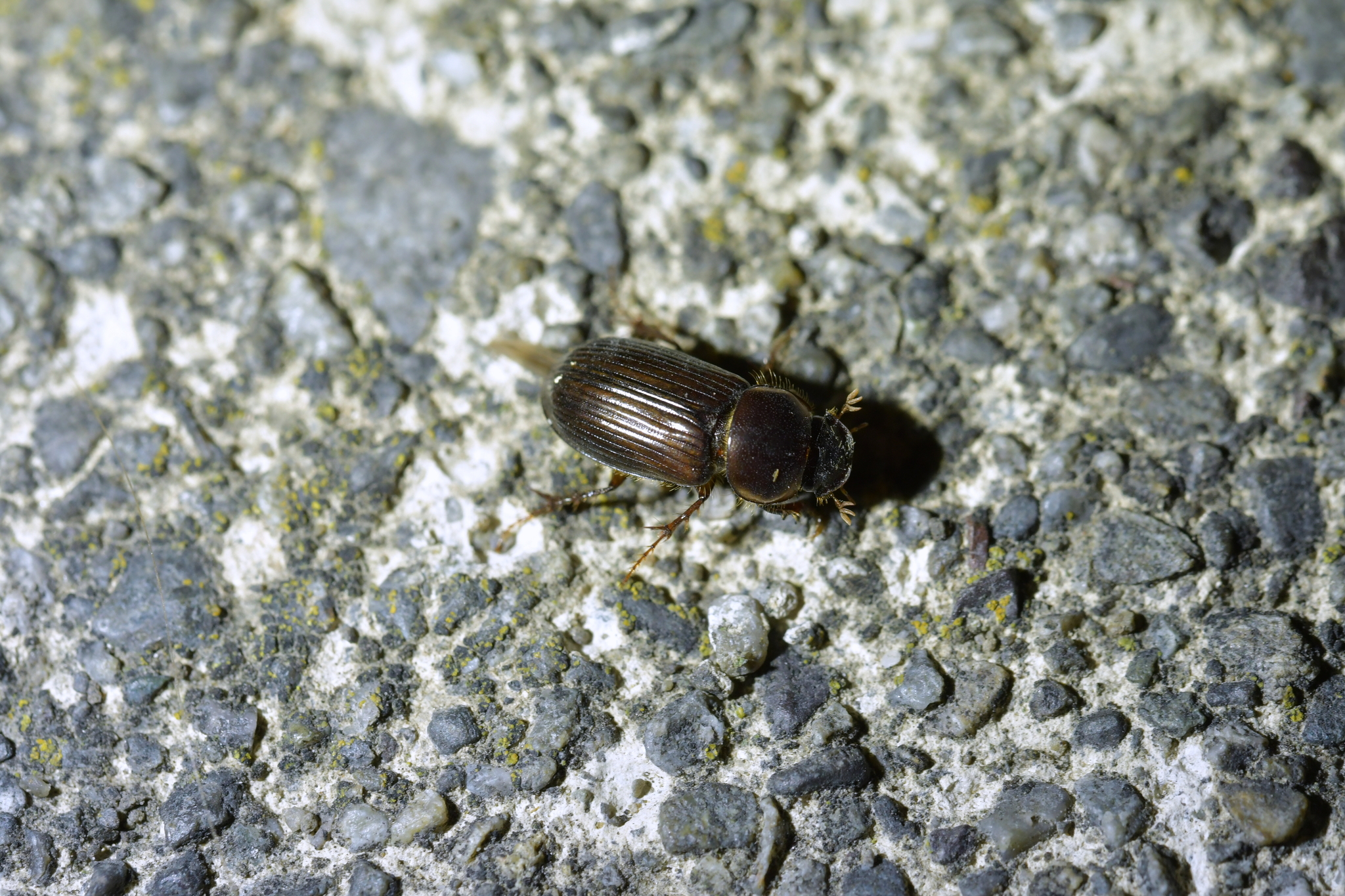
Acrossidius tasmaniae, Tasmanian Grass Grub, New Zealand

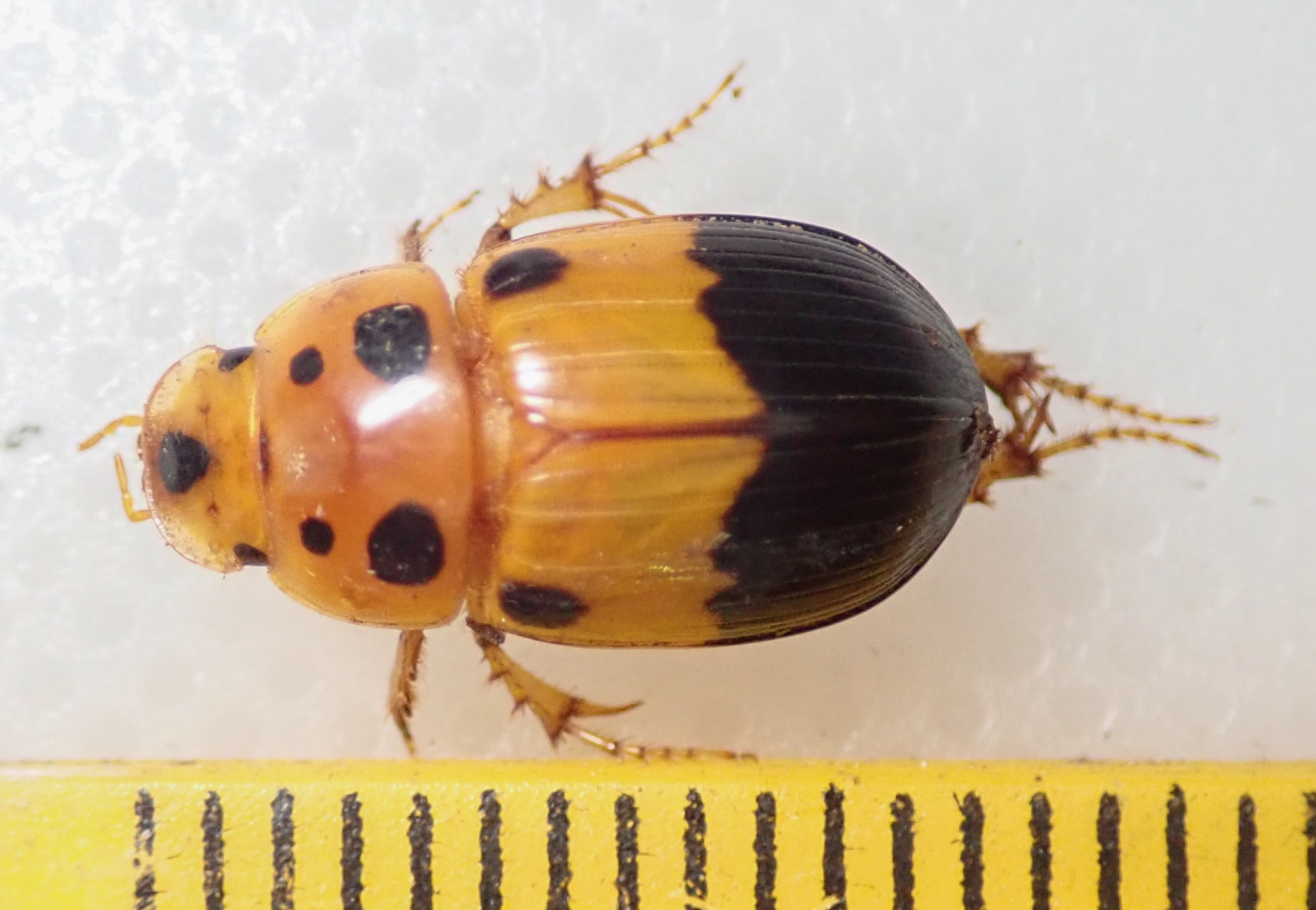
Adeloparius septemmaculatus, Botswana

== Genera ==
These 261 genera belong to the tribe Aphodiini.

- subtribe Aphodiina
  - Acanthaphodius Schmidt, 1909
  - Acanthobodilus Dellacasa, 1983
  - Acrossidius Schmidt, 1914
  - Acrossoides Schmidt, 1914
  - Acrossus Mulsant, 1842
  - Adeloparius Schmidt, 1914
  - Afrodiapterna Dellacasa, 1984
  - Afroemadiellus Bordat, 2019
  - Afrotrichonotulus Bordat, 2016
  - Aganocrossus Reitter, 1895
  - Agoliinus Schmidt, 1914
  - Agolius Mulsant & Rey, 1869
  - Agrilinellus Dellacasa, Dellacasa & Gordon, 2008
  - Agrilinus Mulsant & Rey, 1869
  - Ahermodontus Báguena, 1930
  - Ajmeraphodius Král, Mencl & Rakovič, 2021
  - Alloblackburneus Bordat, 2009
  - Allobodilus Petrovitz, 1963
  - Alocoderus Schmidt, 1914
  - Amidorus Mulsant, 1870
  - Ammoecioides Bordat, 1999
  - Ammoecius Mulsant, 1842
  - Anomalurobius Paulian, 1952
  - Anomius Mulsant & Rey, 1869
  - Aparammoecius Petrovitz, 1958
  - Aphodaulacus Koshantschikov, 1911
  - Aphodiellus Schmidt, 1914
  - Aphodiopsis Paulian, 1942
  - Aphodius Hellwig, 1798
  - Aphodobius Péringuey, 1901
  - Aphodoharmogaster Endrödi, 1983
  - Apsteiniella Schmidt, 1917
  - Australagolius Mencl, 2008
  - Ballucus Gordon & Skelley, 2007
  - Basilewskyanus Endrödi, 1956
  - Biralus Mulsant & Rey, 1869
  - Blackburneus Schmidt, 1914
  - Bodiloides Dellacasa & Dellacasa, 2005
  - Bodilopsis Adam, 1994
  - Bodilus Mulsant & Rey, 1869
  - Bosphorus Şenyüz, 2017
  - Boucomontiellus Balthasar, 1932
  - Brachiaphodius Koshantschikov, 1913
  - Calamosternus Motschulsky, 1859
  - Caligodorus Gordon & Skelley, 2007
  - Calocolobopterus Dellacasa, 1984
  - Candezeollus Stebnicka & Howden, 1995
  - Cantotius Bordat, 2022
  - Carinaulus Tesař, 1945
  - Cephalocyclus Dellacasa & Gordon & Dellacasa, 1998
  - Cesamexico Koçak & Kemal, 2008
  - Chilothorax Motschulsky, 1859
  - Chittius Tarasov, 2008
  - Cinacanthus Schmidt, 1914
  - Cnemargulus Semenov, 1903
  - Cnemisus Motschulsky, 1868
  - Coelotrachelus Schmidt, 1914
  - Colobopteridius Clément, 1958
  - Colobopteroides Paulian, 1942
  - Colobopterus Mulsant, 1842
  - Coprimorphus Mulsant, 1842
  - Coptochiroides Balthasar, 1938
  - Craterocyphus Schmidt, 1914
  - Cryptaphodius Bordat, 2009
  - Cryptoscatomaseter Gordon & Skelley, 2007
  - Dellacasiellus Gordon & Skelley, 2007
  - Dialytellus Brown, 1929
  - Dialytes Harold, 1869
  - Dialytodius Gordon & Skelley, 2007
  - Diapterna Horn, 1887
  - Dilortomaeus Bordat, 2009
  - Doaphius Balthasar, 1941
  - Drepanocanthoides Schmidt, 1914
  - Dudleyellus Bordat, 2009
  - Emadiellus Schmidt, 1914
  - Erytodes Schmidt, 1917
  - Erytus Mulsant & Rey, 1870
  - Esymus Mulsant & Rey, 1869
  - Eudolus Mulsant & Rey, 1869
  - Euhemicyclium Bordat, 2003
  - Euheptaulacus Dellacasa, 1983
  - Euorodalus Dellacasa, 1983
  - Euotophorus Dellacasa, Gordon & Dellacasa, 2016
  - Eupleurus Mulsant, 1842
  - Exaphodius Endrödi, 1960
  - Exoxyomus Bordat, Mencl & Rakovič, 2012
  - Ferrerianus Dellacasa, Dellacasa & Gordon, 2007
  - Flaviellus Gordon & Skelley, 2007
  - Fulvaphodius Bordat, 2022
  - Gaindaphodius Král & Mencl, 2024
  - Geomyphilus Gordon & Skelley, 2007
  - Gilletianus Balthasar, 1933
  - Gonaphodiellus Schmidt, 1914
  - Gonaphodioides Dellacasa, Dellacasa & Gordon, 2012
  - Gonaphodiopsis Dellacasa, Dellacasa & Gordon, 2012
  - Gonaphodius Reitter, 1892
  - Gordonius Skelley, Dellacasa & Dellacasa, 2009
  - Grandinaphodius Ziani, 2002
  - Guanyinaphodius Masumoto & Kiuchi, 2001
  - Harmodactylus Péringuey, 1901
  - Haroldaphodius Bordat, 2003
  - Haroldiellus Gordon & Skelley, 2007
  - Hemicyclium Schmidt, 1914
  - Heptaulacus Mulsant, 1842
  - Hornosus Dellacasa, Dellacasa & Gordon, 2015
  - Iberoaphodius Rössner, 2018
  - Indoblackburneus Mencl, Král & Rakovič, 2019
  - Irrasinus Gordon & Skelley, 2007
  - Jalisco Dellacasa, Gordon & Dellacasa, 2003
  - Karolinella Minkina, 2017
  - Koreoxyomus Kim, 1996
  - Koshantschikovius Schmidt, 1914
  - Labarrus Mulsant & Rey, 1869
  - Lechorodius Gordon & Skelley, 2007
  - Limarus Mulsant & Rey, 1869
  - Linargius Rakovič & Mencl, 2012
  - Lindbergianus Petrovitz, 1961
  - Liothorax Motschulsky, 1859
  - Loboparius Schmidt, 1914
  - Longaphodius Endrödi, 1980
  - Loraphodius Reitter, 1892
  - Loraspis Mulsant & Rey, 1869
  - Lorditomaeus Péringuey, 1901
  - Luxolinus Gordon & Skelley, 2007
  - Macroretroides Bordat, Dellacasa & Dellacasa, 2000
  - Macroretrus Péringuey, 1908
  - Maculaphodius Gordon & Skelley, 2007
  - Mecynodes Mulsant, 1870
  - Megateloides Landin, 1974
  - Megatelus Reitter, 1892
  - Melinopterus Mulsant, 1842
  - Mendidaphodius Reitter, 1901
  - Mendidius Harold, 1868
  - Merogyrus Gordon & Skelley, 2007
  - Mesontoplatys Motschulsky, 1863
  - Metoporaphodius Frolov & Akhmetova, 2017
  - Microteuchestes Landin, 1974
  - Mothon Semenov & Medvedev, 1927
  - Mozartius Nomura & Nakane, 1951
  - Neagolius Koshantschikov, 1912
  - Neocalaphodius Bordat, 1990
  - Neocolobopterus Landin, 1974
  - Neodiapterna Dellacasa, 1984
  - Neoemadiellus Clément, 1986
  - Neoheptaulacus Paulian & Villiers, 1941
  - Neotrichaphodioides Dellacasa, Dellacasa & Skelley, 2010
  - Neotrichonotulus Dellacasa, Gordon & Dellacasa, 2004
  - Nialaphodius Kolbe, 1908
  - Nialosternus Hollande & Therond, 1998
  - Nialus Mulsant & Rey, 1869
  - Nimbus Mulsant & Rey, 1869
  - Nipponaphodius Nakane, 1959
  - Nipponoagoliinus Ochi & Kawahara, 2001
  - Nobiellus Dellacasa & Dellacasa, 2005
  - Nobius Mulsant & Rey, 1869
  - Nolicus Petrovitz, 1962
  - Obaphodius Bordat, 1988
  - Odontacrossus Dellacasa, Král, Dellacasa & Bordat, 2014
  - Odontoxyomus Král, Rakovič & Mencl, 2015
  - Orammoecius Král, Rakovič & Mencl, 2016
  - Orodaliscoides Schmidt, 1914
  - Orodaliscus Reitter, 1900
  - Oromus Mulsant & Rey, 1869
  - Oscarinus Gordon & Skelley, 2007
  - Osmanius Branco & Baraud, 1988
  - Otophorus Mulsant, 1842
  - Oxycorythus Solsky, 1876
  - Oxyomoides Dellacasa, Dellacasa & Gordon, 2016
  - Oxyomus Dejean, 1833
  - Ozodius Skelley, 2007
  - Parabodilus Hollande & Thérond, 1998
  - Paracoptochirus Balthasar, 1963
  - Paracrossidius Balthasar, 1932
  - Paradeloparius Landin, 1959
  - Paradidactylia Balthasar, 1937
  - Paradoaphius Bordat, 2022
  - Parammoecius Seidlitz, 1888
  - Paranimbus Schmidt, 1914
  - Paratrichaphodius Bordat, 2013
  - Pardalosus Gordon & Skelley, 2007
  - Paulianellus Balthasar, 1938
  - Phaeaphodius Reitter, 1892
  - Phalacronothus Motschulsky, 1859
  - Pharaphodius Reitter, 1892
  - Pholeoaphodius Bordat, 2009
  - Plagiogonus Mulsant, 1842
  - Planolinellus Dellacasa & Dellacasa, 2005
  - Planolinoides Dellacasa & Dellacasa, 2005
  - Planolinus Mulsant & Rey, 1869
  - Platyderides Schmidt, 1917
  - Pleuraphodius Schmidt, 1914
  - Podotenoides Paulian, 1942
  - Podotenus Schmidt, 1914
  - Pseudacrossus Reitter, 1892
  - Pseudagolius Schmidt, 1914
  - Pseuderytus Hollande & Thérond, 1998
  - Pseudesymus Orbigny, 1896
  - Pseudoagoliinus Bordat, 1994
  - Pseudoahermodontus Dellacasa & Dellacasa, 1997
  - Pseudoblackburneus Bordat, 2016
  - Pseudocoelotrachelus Dellacasa, Dellacasa & Gordon, 2013
  - Pseudogonaphodiellus Dellacasa, Gordon & Dellacasa, 2007
  - Pseudoheptaulacus Dellacasa & Dellacasa, 2000
  - Pseudopharaphodius Bordat, 1990
  - Pseudopodotenus Dellacasa, 1990
  - Pseudotetraclipeoides Dellacasa, Dellacasa & Gordon, 2015
  - Pseudoteuchestes Dellacasa, 1986
  - Pubinus Mulsant & Rey, 1869
  - Qingaphodius Král, 1997
  - Renaudius Balthasar, 1951
  - Rhodaphodius Adam, 1994
  - Rugaphodius Gordon & Skelley, 2007
  - Sahlbergianus Dellacasa & Dellacasa, 2000
  - Sariangus Rakovič & Mencl, 2011
  - Scabrostomus Gordon & Skelley, 2007
  - Schaefferellus Gordon & Skelley, 2007
  - Serraphodius Kabakov, 1996
  - Setodius Gordon & Skelley, 2007
  - Siamaphodius Masumoto, 1991
  - Sigorus Mulsant & Rey, 1869
  - Simogonius Harold, 1871
  - Sinaphodius Červenka, 1994
  - Sinodiapterna Dellacasa, 1986
  - Sitiphus Fairmaire, 1894
  - Skelleyanus Dellacasa, Dellacasa, Gordon & Stebnicka, 2011
  - Sphaeraphodius Kakizoe, Jiang & Wang, 2021
  - Stenotothorax Schmidt, 1914
  - Strigodius Gordon & Skelley, 2007
  - Subrinus Mulsant & Rey, 1869
  - Sugrames Reitter, 1894
  - Sussorca Paulian, 1954
  - Sybax Boheman, 1857
  - Symphodon Schmidt, 1914
  - Tetraclipeoides Schmidt, 1914
  - Teuchestes Mulsant, 1842
  - Trichaphodiellus Schmidt, 1914
  - Trichaphodioides Paulian, 1942
  - Trichaphodius Schmidt, 1914
  - Trichioaparammoecius Minkina, 2018
  - Trichonotuloides Balthasar, 1945
  - Trichonotulus Bedel, 1911
  - Trichoparadidactylia Bordat, 2022
  - Tristaphodius Balthasar, 1932
  - Turanella Semenov, 1905
  - Vladimirellus Dellacasa, Dellacasa & Bordat, 2002
  - Volinus Mulsant & Rey, 1869
  - Xenoheptaulacus Hinton, 1934
  - Xeropsamobeus Saylor, 1937
  - Youngaphodius Bordat, 1988
- subtribe Didactyliina Pittino, 1984
  - Aidophus (Balthasar, 1963)
  - Didactylia Orbigny, 1896
  - Pseudomothon Pittino, 1984
  - Trigonoscelus (Petrovitz, 1963)
- subtribe Proctophanina Stebnicka & Howden, 1995
  - Australaphodius (Balthasar, 1942)
  - Coptochirus Harold, 1859
  - Drepanocanthus Péringuey, 1901
  - Goiginus Endrödi, 1982
  - Harmogaster Harold, 1861
  - Proctophanes Harold, 1861
  - Pseudodrepanocanthus (Bordat, 1993)
  - Pseudoxyomus Petrovitz, 1962

== Selected former genera ==
- Lunaphodius Balthasar, 1964
