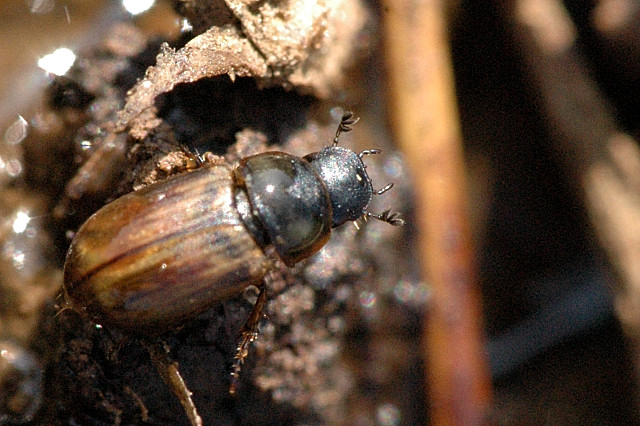
- Volinus sticticus

Scientific classification
- Kingdom: Animalia
- Phylum: Arthropoda
- Clade: Pancrustacea
- Class: Insecta
- Order: Coleoptera
- Suborder: Polyphaga
- Infraorder: Scarabaeiformia
- Family: Scarabaeidae
- Tribe: Aphodiini
- Genus: Volinus; Mulsant and Rey, 1869
- Species: V. sticticus

Binomial name
- Volinus sticticus (Panzer, 1798)

Synonyms
- Aphodius (Volinus) Mulsant & Rey, 1870; Scarabaeus sticticus Panzer, 1798; Scarabaeus equestris Panzer, 1798; Aphodius sticticus clypeolatus Mulsant, 1842; Aphodius sticticus confusus Mulsant, 1842; Aphodius sticticus occelatus Mulsant, 1842; Aphodius sticticus pallescens Mulsant, 1842; Aphodius sticticus prolongatus Mulsant, 1842; Aphodius sticticus striolatus Mulsant, 1842; Scarabaeus nemoralis Panzer, 1799

= Volinus =

Genus of beetles

Volinus is a genus of scarab beetles in the family Scarabaeidae. This genus has a single species, Volinus sticticus. It is found in Europe and Asia.

== Description ==
Adults reach a length of about 4–5 mm (0.16–0.20 in). They have an oblong, moderately convex, feebly shiny, nearly glabrous, blackish body, with two spots and the sides of the pronotum yellowish. The elytra are dirty yellow, with blackish striae and with two bands of blackish spots.

== Distribution ==
Albania, Armenia, Austria, Belarus, Belgium, Bosnia and Herzegovina, Bulgaria, Croatia, the Czech Republic, Denmark, Estonia, Finland, Georgia, Germany, Great Britain, Greece, Hungary, Iran, Italy, Kosovo, Lithuania, Macedonia, Montenegro, the Netherlands, Norway, Poland, Romania, Russia, Serbia, Slovakia, Slovenia, Spain, Sweden, Switzerland, Turkey and Ukraine.
