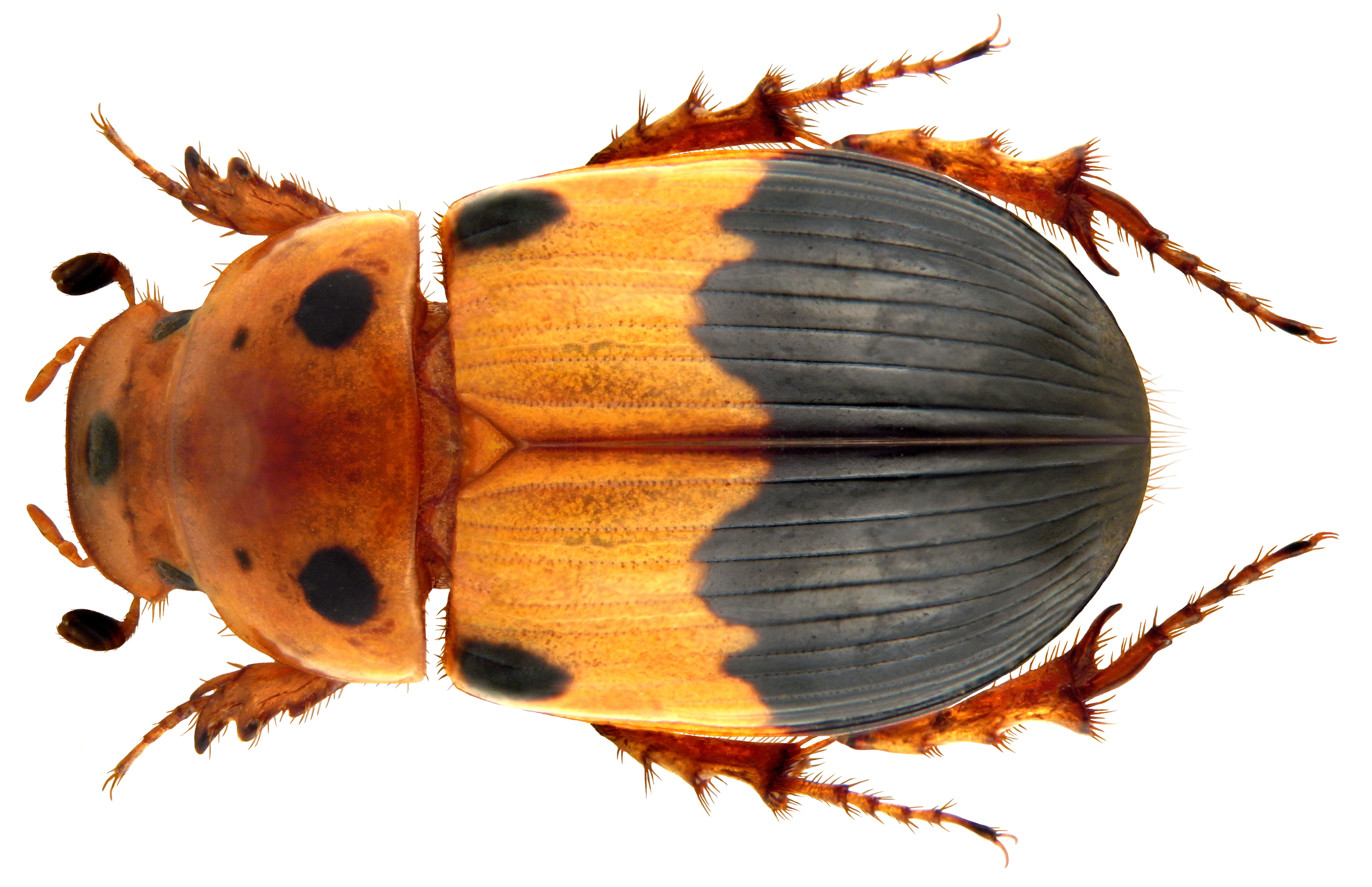
- Aphodius septemmaculatus

Scientific classification
- Domain: Eukaryota
- Kingdom: Animalia
- Phylum: Arthropoda
- Class: Insecta
- Order: Coleoptera
- Suborder: Polyphaga
- Infraorder: Scarabaeiformia
- Family: Scarabaeidae
- Subfamily: Aphodiinae; Leach, 1815

= Aphodiinae =

Subfamily of beetles

Aphodiinae is a subfamily of the scarab beetle family, Scarabaeidae. Members of this subfamily are known commonly as the small dung beetles and many, but not all, are dung beetles. These beetles are found worldwide.

These beetles are small scarab beetles, most less than 8 millimeters long. Many have small mandibles that are covered by a widened clypeus, the exoskeleton plate above the mouth. The feet are clawed.

This is a diverse subfamily with varied life strategies and habitat types. Many species are dung beetles, which collect and feed on animal dung. Other species are detritivores or saprophages, which feed on dead matter, and some are predatory. Some are known as inquilines, living in ant or termite nests, and some are sand-dwelling beetles. A survey of South American aphodiines found them in diverse habitat types including temperate rainforests, high-elevation Andean grassland, Patagonian steppe, coastal sand dunes, and subantarctic beech forest.

Research on elephant dung finds the vast majority of dung beetles exploiting during the night are aphodiine dwellers (98%). In contrast during the day, they were a minority (9.2%) with the majority (85%) being tunnelers (paracoprids).

The role of aphodiines in removing dung has been suggested to have been underestimated since they are better flyers than other types of dung beetles and, therefore, not so readily caught by traps as tunnelers or rollers.

The Catalog of Life and World and World Scarabaeidae Database (2023) include 12 tribes with more than 380 genera and 3,500 described species in Aphodiinae.

== Tribes ==
- Aphodiini Leach, 1815
- Corythoderini Schmidt, 1910
- Eupariini Schmidt, 1910
- Hornietiini Minkina, 2020
- Odochilini Rakovič, 1987
- Odontolochini Stebnicka & Howden, 1996
- Psammodiini Mulsant, 1842
- Rhyparini Schmidt, 1910
- Stereomerini Howden & Storey, 1992
- Termitoderini Tangelder & Krikken, 1982
- Thinorycterini Semenov & Reichardt, 1925
- † Psammaegialiini Nikolajev, Wang & Zhang, 2014

== Gallery ==
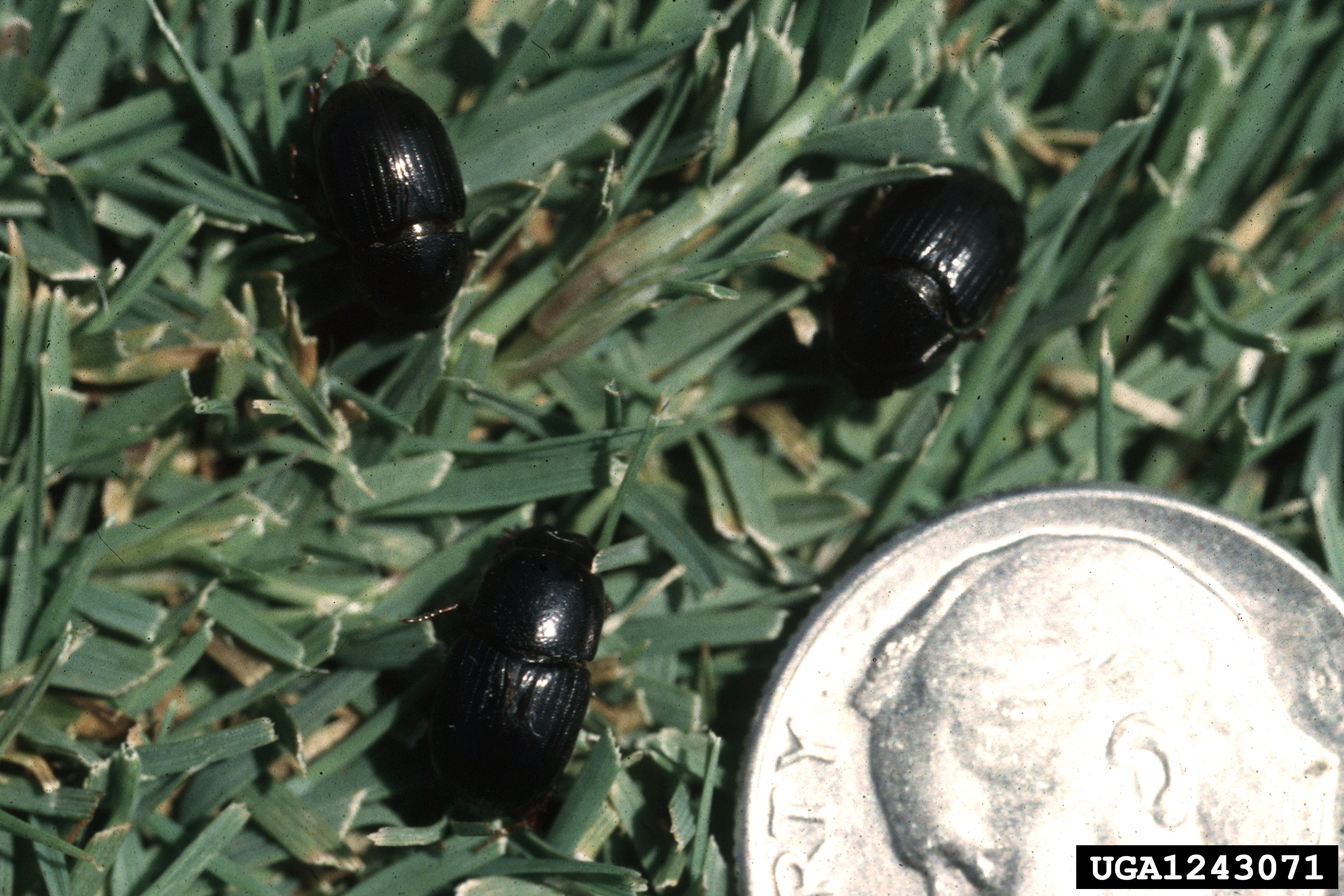
Aphodius omissus

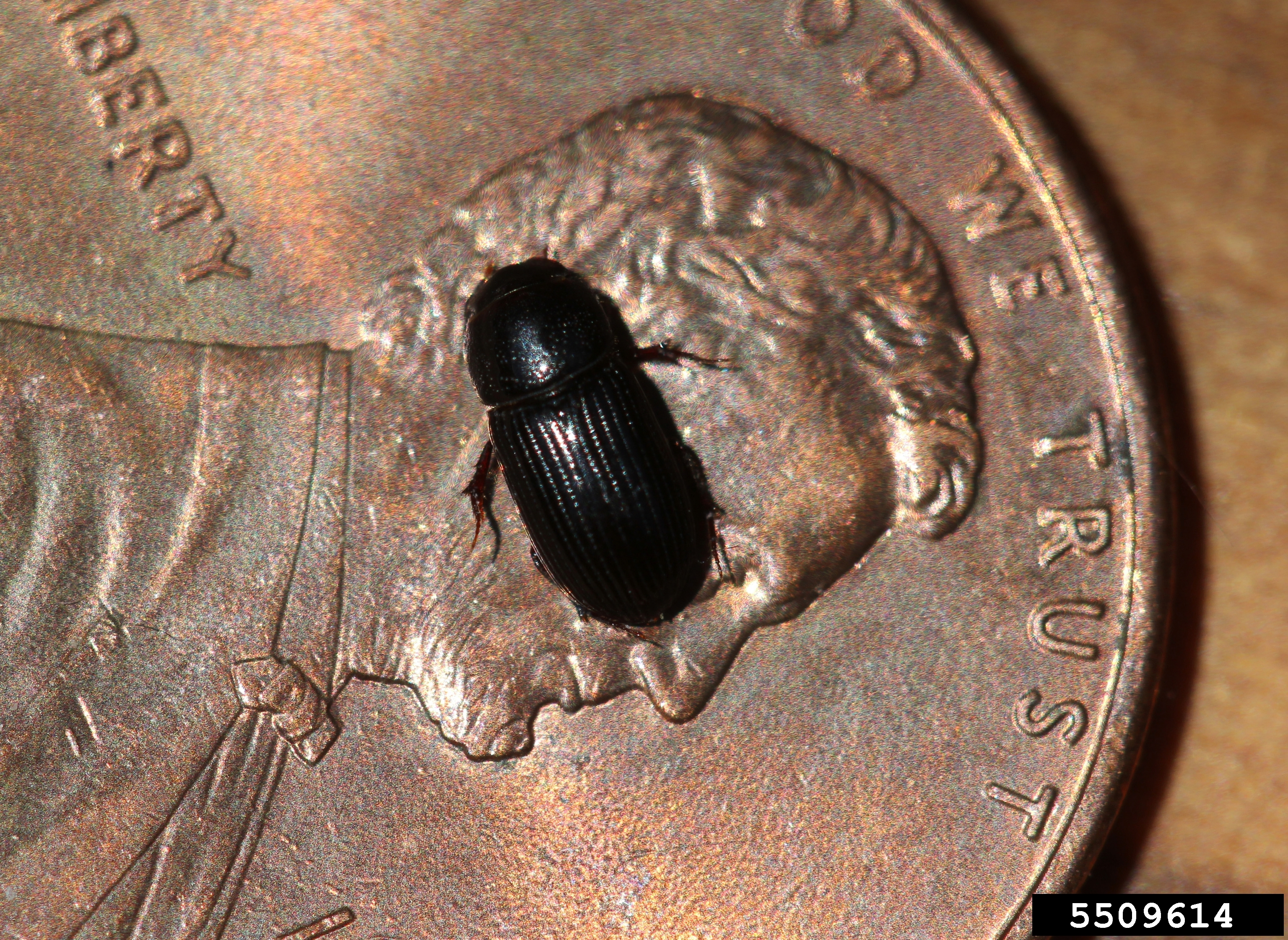
Ataenius spretulus

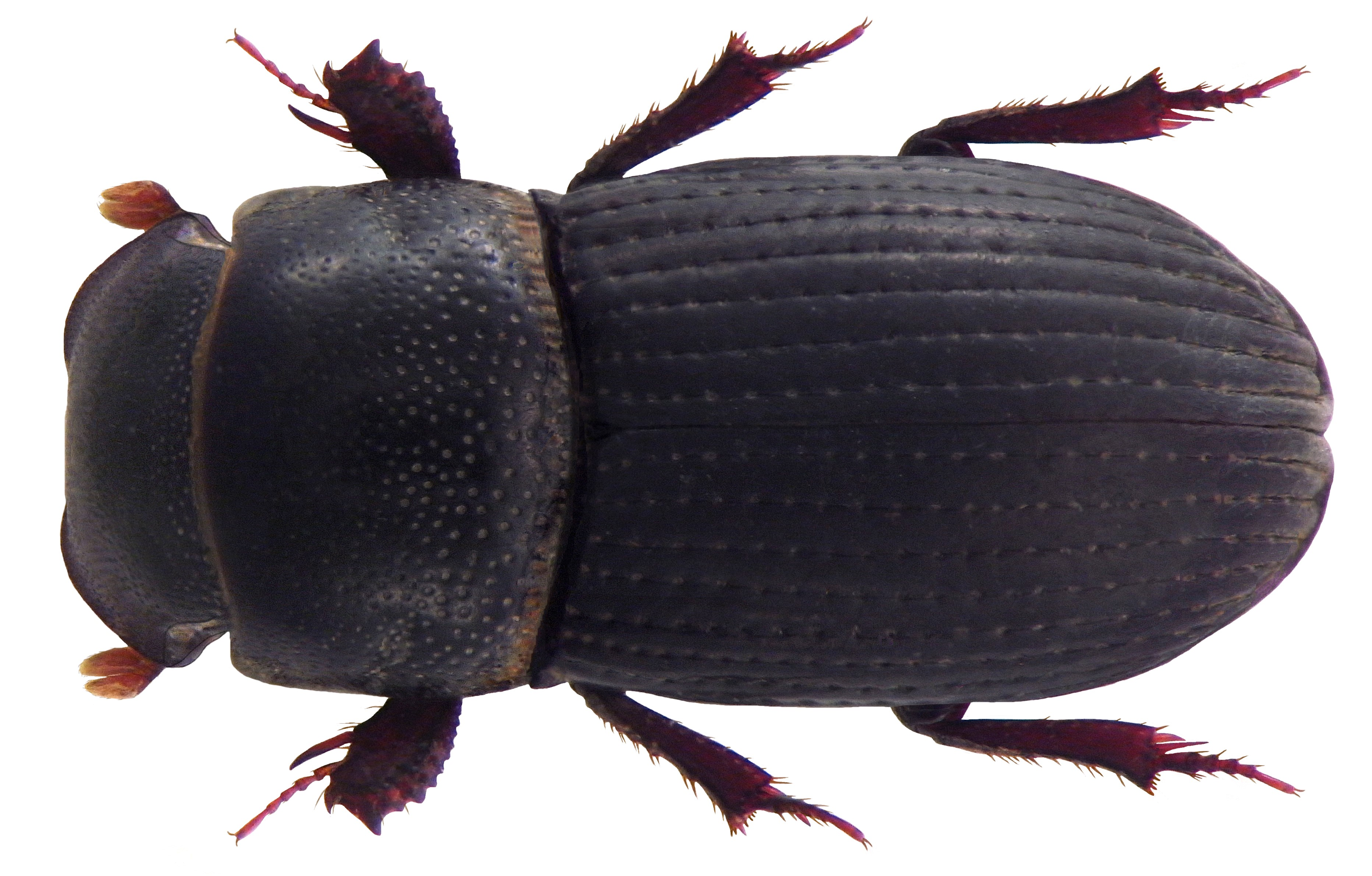
Dialytes monstrosus

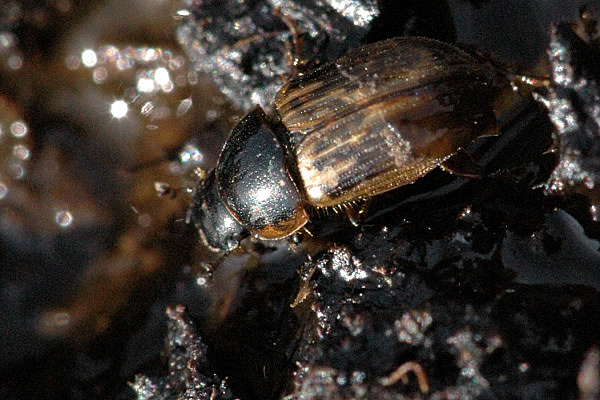
Volinus sticticus

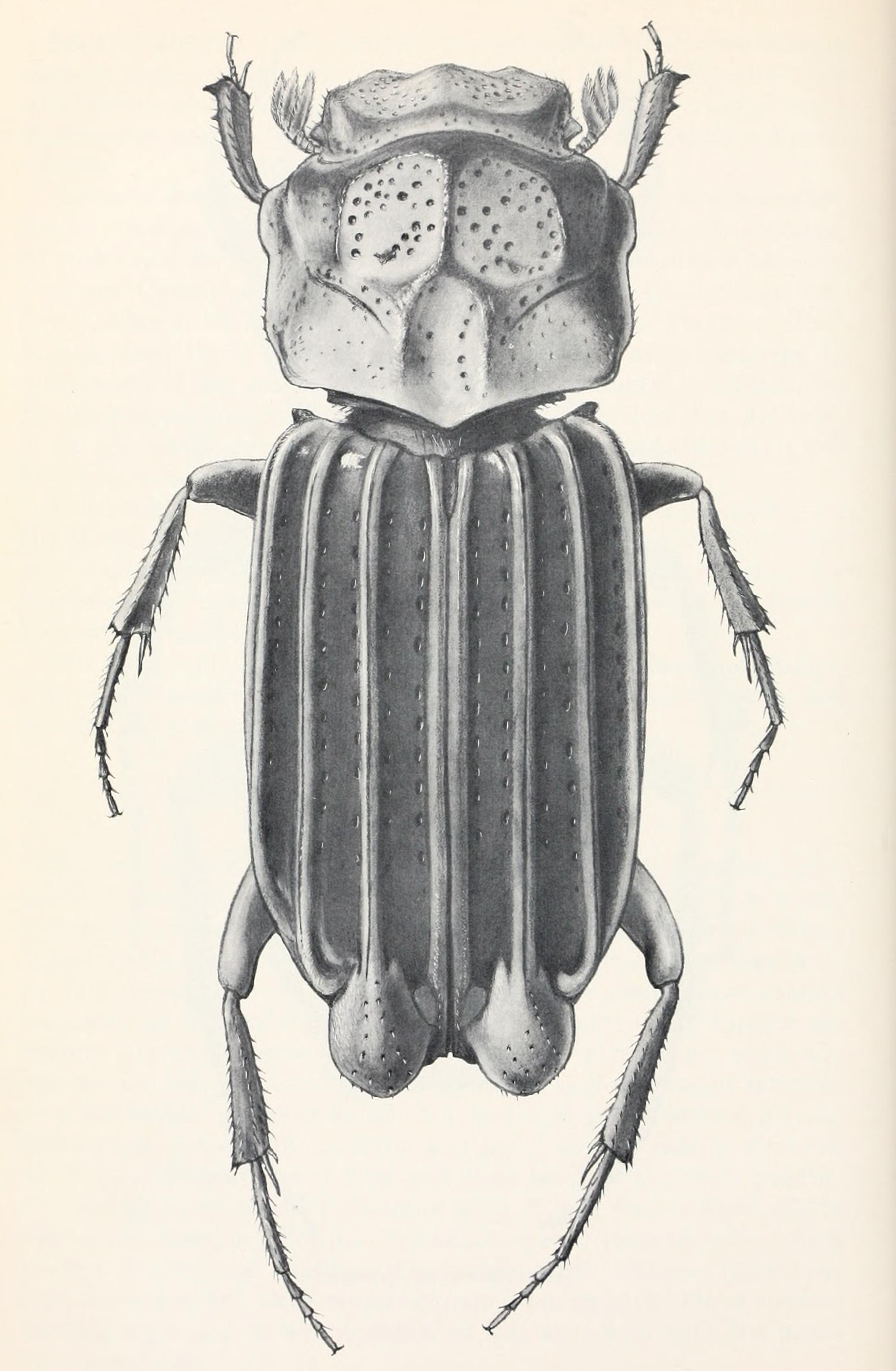
Cartwrightia cartwrighti

== See also ==
- List of Aphodiidae genera
