= Gongrolophus =

Scientific classification
- Kingdom: Animalia
- Phylum: Arthropoda
- Clade: Pancrustacea
- Class: Insecta
- Order: Coleoptera
- Suborder: Polyphaga
- Infraorder: Scarabaeiformia
- Family: Scarabaeidae
- Subfamily: Aphodiinae
- Tribe: Odontolochini
- Genus: Gongrolophus; Stebnicka & Howden, 1996
- Species: G. storeyi

Binomial name
- Gongrolophus storeyi Stebnicka & Howden, 1996

Genus of beetles

Gongrolophus is a genus of beetle of the family Scarabaeidae. It is monotypic, being represented by the single species, Gongrolophus storeyi, which is found in Australia (Queensland) and Peru.

== Description ==
Adults reach a length of about 5.9–6.5 mm (0.23–0.26 in). They have an elongate, convex, slightly shining, black body, which is partially covered with an argillaceous coating.

== Etymology ==
The species is named for Ross Storey.
