= Saprositellus ariquemes =

Scientific classification
- Kingdom: Animalia
- Phylum: Arthropoda
- Clade: Pancrustacea
- Class: Insecta
- Order: Coleoptera
- Suborder: Polyphaga
- Infraorder: Scarabaeiformia
- Family: Scarabaeidae
- Genus: Saprositellus
- Species: S. ariquemes

Binomial name
- Saprositellus ariquemes Stebnicka, 2003

Species of beetle

Saprositellus ariquemes is a species of beetle of the family Scarabaeidae. It is found in Bolivia, Brazil (Acre, Amazonas, Mato Grosso, Rondônia), French Guiana and Guyana.

== Description ==
Adults reach a length of about 2.6–2.8 mm (0.10–0.11 in). The head has coarse punctures. The pronotum is coarsely and densely punctate and has a posterior marginal line. The elytra have a small humeral tooth and the striae are wider than the carinate interstriae.

== Etymology ==
The species name is derived from the name of the type locality, Ariquemes.
