= Odontolochus weiri =

Scientific classification
- Kingdom: Animalia
- Phylum: Arthropoda
- Clade: Pancrustacea
- Class: Insecta
- Order: Coleoptera
- Suborder: Polyphaga
- Infraorder: Scarabaeiformia
- Family: Scarabaeidae
- Genus: Odontolochus
- Species: O. weiri

Binomial name
- Odontolochus weiri Stebnicka & Howden, 1996

Species of beetle

Odontolochus weiri is a species of beetle of the family Scarabaeidae. It is found in Australia (New South Wales, Queensland).

== Description ==
Adults reach a length of about 2.8–3 mm (0.11–0.12 in). They have an elongate-oval, convex, glabrous, dull rusty brown to black body, which is partially covered with an argillaceous coating.

== Etymology ==
The species is named for Tom A. Weir.
