= Amerilochus =

Scientific classification
- Kingdom: Animalia
- Phylum: Arthropoda
- Clade: Pancrustacea
- Class: Insecta
- Order: Coleoptera
- Suborder: Polyphaga
- Infraorder: Scarabaeiformia
- Family: Scarabaeidae
- Subfamily: Aphodiinae
- Tribe: Odontolochini
- Genus: Amerilochus; Skelley, 2007
- Species: A. cinereus

Binomial name
- Amerilochus cinereus Skelley, 2007

Genus of beetles

Amerilochus is a genus of beetle of the family Scarabaeidae. It is monotypic, being represented by the single species, Amerilochus cinereus, which is found in Brazil (Amazonas) and Peru.

== Description ==
Adults reach a length of about 2.4 mm (0.094 in). The body is elongate, cylindrical and argillaceous grey. The head is wide and downward bent and the clypeus is sinuate, with the anterior margin thickened. The pronotum has sharply declined sides and has two longitudinal and parallel carinae dorsally. The lateral margins are strongly sinuate before the posterior margin, the emargination forming a small tooth. The posterior margin has a strong marginal line. The elytra with humerus projecting forwards, finely setaceous.

== Life history ==
Specimens have been collected at 90 metres above sea level in the Amazon rainfores.
