= Odontolochini =

Scientific classification
- Kingdom: Animalia
- Phylum: Arthropoda
- Clade: Pancrustacea
- Class: Insecta
- Order: Coleoptera
- Suborder: Polyphaga
- Infraorder: Scarabaeiformia
- Family: Scarabaeidae
- Subfamily: Aphodiinae
- Tribe: Odontolochini; Stebnicka & Howden, 1996

Tribe of beetles

Odontolochini is a tribe of scarab beetles in the family Scarabaeidae. There are about 6 genera and about 30 described species in Odontolochini, found in the Neotropics, Australia, and Africa.

== Genera ==
These six genera belong to the tribe Odontolochini:

- Amerilochus Skelley, 2007 (Neotropics)
- Gongrolophus Stebnicka & Howden, 1996 (Australia)
- Odontolochus Schmidt, 1917 (tropical Africa)
- Saprolochus Stebnicka & Galante, 2007 (Neotropics)
- Saprositellus Balthasar, 1967 (Neotropics)
- Stebnickiella Skelley, 2007 (Neotropics)
