= Saprolochus lobatus =

Scientific classification
- Kingdom: Animalia
- Phylum: Arthropoda
- Clade: Pancrustacea
- Class: Insecta
- Order: Coleoptera
- Suborder: Polyphaga
- Infraorder: Scarabaeiformia
- Family: Scarabaeidae
- Genus: Saprolochus
- Species: S. lobatus

Binomial name
- Saprolochus lobatus Skelley, 2007

Species of beetle

Saprolochus lobatus is a species of beetle of the family Scarabaeidae. It is found in Guyana.

== Description ==
Adults reach a length of about 3 mm (0.12 in). They have an elongate, robust, somewhat parallel-sided, weakly glossy, dark reddish-brown body.

== Etymology ==
The species name refers to the distinctly lobed pronotal margin.
