= Odontolochus setulosus =

Scientific classification
- Kingdom: Animalia
- Phylum: Arthropoda
- Clade: Pancrustacea
- Class: Insecta
- Order: Coleoptera
- Suborder: Polyphaga
- Infraorder: Scarabaeiformia
- Family: Scarabaeidae
- Genus: Odontolochus
- Species: O. setulosus

Binomial name
- Odontolochus setulosus Endrödi, 1964

Species of beetle

Odontolochus setulosus is a species of beetle of the family Scarabaeidae. It is found in the Democratic Republic of the Congo and the Central African Republic.

== Description ==
Adults reach a length of about 3–3.5 mm (0.12–0.14 in). They have a dark castaneous to piceous, dull body, with setose elytra.
