= Saprositellus denticulatus =

Scientific classification
- Kingdom: Animalia
- Phylum: Arthropoda
- Clade: Pancrustacea
- Class: Insecta
- Order: Coleoptera
- Suborder: Polyphaga
- Infraorder: Scarabaeiformia
- Family: Scarabaeidae
- Genus: Saprositellus
- Species: S. denticulatus

Binomial name
- Saprositellus denticulatus Balthasar, 1967

Species of beetle

Saprositellus denticulatus is a species of beetle of the family Scarabaeidae. It is found in Brazil (Amazonas) and Peru.

== Description ==
Adults reach a length of about 2.8–3 mm (0.11–0.12 in). The head has coarse punctures. The pronotum is coarsely and densely punctate. The elytra have a small humeral tooth and the striae are coarsely punctured and are as wide as the convex interstriae.

== Life history ==
Specimens were collected in the Amazon forest.
