= Odontolochus monteithi =

Scientific classification
- Kingdom: Animalia
- Phylum: Arthropoda
- Clade: Pancrustacea
- Class: Insecta
- Order: Coleoptera
- Suborder: Polyphaga
- Infraorder: Scarabaeiformia
- Family: Scarabaeidae
- Genus: Odontolochus
- Species: O. monteithi

Binomial name
- Odontolochus monteithi Stebnicka & Howden, 1996

Species of beetle

Odontolochus monteithi is a species of beetle of the family Scarabaeidae. It is found in Australia (New South Wales, Queensland).

== Description ==
Adults reach a length of about 2.7–2.8 mm (0.11–0.11 in). They have an elongate-oval, convex, slightly shining, dark brown body, with a glabrous dorsum and partially covered by an argillaceous coating. The legs are reddish-brown.

== Etymology ==
The species is named for Geoff Monteith.
