= Odontolochus spinicollis =

Scientific classification
- Kingdom: Animalia
- Phylum: Arthropoda
- Clade: Pancrustacea
- Class: Insecta
- Order: Coleoptera
- Suborder: Polyphaga
- Infraorder: Scarabaeiformia
- Family: Scarabaeidae
- Genus: Odontolochus
- Species: O. spinicollis

Binomial name
- Odontolochus spinicollis (Harold, 1871)

Synonyms
- Ataenius spinicollis Harold, 1871; Odontolochus heyrovskyi Balthasar, 1963; Odontolochus granulipennis Petrovitz, 1956

Species of beetle

Odontolochus spinicollis is a species of beetle of the family Scarabaeidae. It is found in Cameroon, Ethiopia, Gambia, Ghana, Ivory Coast, Kenya, the Democratic Republic of the Congo, Guinea, Senegal, Tanzania and Zambia.

== Description ==
Adults reach a length of about 3.5–4.5 mm (0.14–0.18 in). They have an oblong-oval, brownish black to piceous, shining body.
