= Saprositellus kenodontus =

Scientific classification
- Kingdom: Animalia
- Phylum: Arthropoda
- Clade: Pancrustacea
- Class: Insecta
- Order: Coleoptera
- Suborder: Polyphaga
- Infraorder: Scarabaeiformia
- Family: Scarabaeidae
- Genus: Saprositellus
- Species: S. kenodontus

Binomial name
- Saprositellus kenodontus Skelley, 2007

Species of beetle

Saprositellus kenodontus is a species of beetle of the family Scarabaeidae. It is found in Guyana.

== Description ==
Adults reach a length of about 3.5 mm (0.14 in). They have an elongate, dull, dark reddish-brown (nearly black) body.

== Etymology ==
The species name is derived from Greek kenodontis (meaning toothless, bare) and refers to the smooth lateral pronotal margin, lacking teeth.
