= Saprolochus tambopatae =

Scientific classification
- Kingdom: Animalia
- Phylum: Arthropoda
- Clade: Pancrustacea
- Class: Insecta
- Order: Coleoptera
- Suborder: Polyphaga
- Infraorder: Scarabaeiformia
- Family: Scarabaeidae
- Genus: Saprolochus
- Species: S. tambopatae

Binomial name
- Saprolochus tambopatae Stebnicka & Galante, 2007

Species of beetle

Saprolochus tambopatae is a species of beetle of the family Scarabaeidae. It is found in Colombia, Bolivia and Peru.

== Description ==
Adults reach a length of about 2.3–2.9 mm (0.091–0.114 in). They have a shiny, reddish black body, with the elytra lighter than the head and pronotum.
