= Odontolochus villiersi =

Scientific classification
- Kingdom: Animalia
- Phylum: Arthropoda
- Clade: Pancrustacea
- Class: Insecta
- Order: Coleoptera
- Suborder: Polyphaga
- Infraorder: Scarabaeiformia
- Family: Scarabaeidae
- Genus: Odontolochus
- Species: O. villiersi

Binomial name
- Odontolochus villiersi Petrovitz, 1966

Species of beetle

Odontolochus villiersi is a species of beetle of the family Scarabaeidae. It is found in Gabon, Ghana and the Democratic Republic of the Congo.

== Description ==
Adults reach a length of about 2.5–3 mm (0.098–0.118 in). They have a piceous, opaque body.
