= Odontolochus paucus =

Scientific classification
- Kingdom: Animalia
- Phylum: Arthropoda
- Clade: Pancrustacea
- Class: Insecta
- Order: Coleoptera
- Suborder: Polyphaga
- Infraorder: Scarabaeiformia
- Family: Scarabaeidae
- Genus: Odontolochus
- Species: O. paucus

Binomial name
- Odontolochus paucus Schmidt, 1917

Species of beetle

Odontolochus paucus is a species of beetle of the family Scarabaeidae. It is found in Kenya, the Democratic Republic of the Congo, South Africa (Gauteng, North-West Province), Rwanda, Sudan and Tanzania.

== Description ==
Adults reach a length of about 4–4.5 mm (0.16–0.18 in). They have an oblong-oval, brownish black to piceous body.
