= Odontolochus raffrayi =

Scientific classification
- Kingdom: Animalia
- Phylum: Arthropoda
- Clade: Pancrustacea
- Class: Insecta
- Order: Coleoptera
- Suborder: Polyphaga
- Infraorder: Scarabaeiformia
- Family: Scarabaeidae
- Genus: Odontolochus
- Species: O. raffrayi

Binomial name
- Odontolochus raffrayi Paulian, 1942

Synonyms
- Loeblitus sulcatus Endrödi, 1979; Odontolochus (Anodontolochus) sulcatus Endrödi, 1964; Odontolochus (Anodontolochus) parcepunctatus Petrovitz, 1956; Odontolochus (Anodontolochus) chevalieri Paulian, 1942

Species of beetle

Odontolochus raffrayi is a species of beetle of the family Scarabaeidae. It is found in Ethiopia, Ghana, Ivory Coast, the Democratic Republic of the Congo, Guinea and Sudan.

== Description ==
Adults reach a length of about 4–4.8 mm (0.16–0.19 in). They have a dark castaneous, moderately shiny body.
