= Saprolochus peruvianus =

Scientific classification
- Kingdom: Animalia
- Phylum: Arthropoda
- Clade: Pancrustacea
- Class: Insecta
- Order: Coleoptera
- Suborder: Polyphaga
- Infraorder: Scarabaeiformia
- Family: Scarabaeidae
- Genus: Saprolochus
- Species: S. peruvianus

Binomial name
- Saprolochus peruvianus Minkina, Skelley & Gama, 2025

Species of beetle

Saprolochus peruvianus is a species of beetle of the family Scarabaeidae. It is found in Peru.

== Description ==
Adults reach a length of about 2.9 mm (0.11 in). They have an elongate, robust, shiny, reddish brown, glabrous body.

== Etymology ==
The species name is derived from the name Peru, where the species was collected.
