= Odontolochus ferenczi =

Scientific classification
- Kingdom: Animalia
- Phylum: Arthropoda
- Clade: Pancrustacea
- Class: Insecta
- Order: Coleoptera
- Suborder: Polyphaga
- Infraorder: Scarabaeiformia
- Family: Scarabaeidae
- Genus: Odontolochus
- Species: O. ferenczi

Binomial name
- Odontolochus ferenczi Endrödi, 1976

Species of beetle

Odontolochus ferenczi is a species of beetle of the family Scarabaeidae. It is found in Guinea, Sierra Leone and Gambia.

== Description ==
Adults reach a length of about 2.5–3 mm (0.098–0.118 in). They have a dark brown to piceous, dull body.
