= Saprositellus santaritae =

Scientific classification
- Kingdom: Animalia
- Phylum: Arthropoda
- Clade: Pancrustacea
- Class: Insecta
- Order: Coleoptera
- Suborder: Polyphaga
- Infraorder: Scarabaeiformia
- Family: Scarabaeidae
- Genus: Saprositellus
- Species: S. santaritae

Binomial name
- Saprositellus santaritae Stebnicka, 2003

Species of beetle

Saprositellus santaritae is a species of beetle of the family Scarabaeidae. It is found in Colombia and Panama.

== Description ==
Adults reach a length of about 2.9 mm (0.11 in). They have an elongate, almost parallel-sided, dark brown body, with the legs reddish-brown and with a microreticulate surface.

== Etymology ==
The species name is derived from the type locality, the Santa Rita ridge in Panama.
