= Odontolochus gestroi =

Scientific classification
- Kingdom: Animalia
- Phylum: Arthropoda
- Clade: Pancrustacea
- Class: Insecta
- Order: Coleoptera
- Suborder: Polyphaga
- Infraorder: Scarabaeiformia
- Family: Scarabaeidae
- Genus: Odontolochus
- Species: O. gestroi

Binomial name
- Odontolochus gestroi (Clouët des Pesruches, 1900)

Synonyms
- Odontoderus gestroi Clouët des Pesruches, 1900

Species of beetle

Odontolochus gestroi is a species of beetle of the family Scarabaeidae. It is found in Cameroon, the Central African Republic, Ghana, Ivory Coast, the Democratic Republic of the Congo, Guinea, the Republic of the Congo, Sierra Leone and Togo.

== Description ==
Adults reach a length of about 2.5–3 mm (0.098–0.118 in). They have a dark brown to piceous, dull body.
