= Odontolochus oberthuri =

Scientific classification
- Kingdom: Animalia
- Phylum: Arthropoda
- Clade: Pancrustacea
- Class: Insecta
- Order: Coleoptera
- Suborder: Polyphaga
- Infraorder: Scarabaeiformia
- Family: Scarabaeidae
- Genus: Odontolochus
- Species: O. oberthuri

Binomial name
- Odontolochus oberthuri (Clouët des Pesruches, 1900)

Synonyms
- Odontoderus oberthuri Clouët des Pesruches, 1900; Odontolochus elgonensis Balthasar, 1961; Odontolochus oberthueri

Species of beetle

Odontolochus oberthuri is a species of beetle of the family Scarabaeidae. It is found in the Central African Republic, Gambia, Ghana, Ivory Coast, Kenya, the Democratic Republic of the Congo, Guinea, the Republic of the Congo, Senegal, Sierra Leone, Uganda and Zambia.

== Description ==
Adults reach a length of about 3.2–3.9 mm (0.13–0.15 in). They have a parallel-sided, black, dull body.
