= Odontolochus burgeoni =

Scientific classification
- Kingdom: Animalia
- Phylum: Arthropoda
- Clade: Pancrustacea
- Class: Insecta
- Order: Coleoptera
- Suborder: Polyphaga
- Infraorder: Scarabaeiformia
- Family: Scarabaeidae
- Genus: Odontolochus
- Species: O. burgeoni

Binomial name
- Odontolochus burgeoni (Boucomont, 1930)

Synonyms
- Odontoderus burgeoni Boucomont, 1930

Species of beetle

Odontolochus burgeoni is a species of beetle of the family Scarabaeidae. It is found in Cameroon, the Democratic Republic of the Congo and the Republic of the Congo.

== Description ==
Adults reach a length of about 2.5–2.8 mm (0.098–0.110 in). They have a dark brown to piceous, dull body.
