= Saprositellus =

Scientific classification
- Kingdom: Animalia
- Phylum: Arthropoda
- Clade: Pancrustacea
- Class: Insecta
- Order: Coleoptera
- Suborder: Polyphaga
- Infraorder: Scarabaeiformia
- Family: Scarabaeidae
- Subfamily: Aphodiinae
- Tribe: Odontolochini
- Genus: Saprositellus; Balthasar, 1967

Genus of beetles

Saprositellus is a genus of beetles of the family Scarabaeidae.

== Species ==
- Saprositellus ariquemes Stebnicka, 2003
- Saprositellus denticulatus Balthasar, 1967
- Saprositellus kenodontus Skelley, 2007
- Saprositellus peruanus Stebnicka, 2003
- Saprositellus santaritae Stebnicka, 2003
