= Odontolochus costatus =

Scientific classification
- Kingdom: Animalia
- Phylum: Arthropoda
- Clade: Pancrustacea
- Class: Insecta
- Order: Coleoptera
- Suborder: Polyphaga
- Infraorder: Scarabaeiformia
- Family: Scarabaeidae
- Genus: Odontolochus
- Species: O. costatus

Binomial name
- Odontolochus costatus Endrödi, 1964

Species of beetle

Odontolochus costatus is a species of beetle of the family Scarabaeidae. It is found in Burkina Faso, Cameroon, Gabon and the Democratic Republic of the Congo.

== Description ==
Adults reach a length of about 3.5–4 mm (0.14–0.16 in). They have an oblong-oval, piceous, dull body.
