= Odontolochus lackneri =

Scientific classification
- Kingdom: Animalia
- Phylum: Arthropoda
- Clade: Pancrustacea
- Class: Insecta
- Order: Coleoptera
- Suborder: Polyphaga
- Infraorder: Scarabaeiformia
- Family: Scarabaeidae
- Genus: Odontolochus
- Species: O. lackneri

Binomial name
- Odontolochus lackneri Rakovič, Mencl & Král, 2014

Species of beetle

Odontolochus lackneri is a species of beetle of the family Scarabaeidae. It is found in Angola.

== Description ==
Adults reach a length of about 4.8–5.9 mm (0.19–0.23 in). They have an oblong-oval, convex, glabrous, fairly shining and mostly black body, with the antennae and palpi yellowish brown and the legs brown. The ventral surface is dark brown to black.

== Etymology ==
The species is named in honour of the collector of most of the type specimens, and Histeridae specialist, Tomáš Lackner.
