= Saprolochus =

Scientific classification
- Kingdom: Animalia
- Phylum: Arthropoda
- Clade: Pancrustacea
- Class: Insecta
- Order: Coleoptera
- Suborder: Polyphaga
- Infraorder: Scarabaeiformia
- Family: Scarabaeidae
- Subfamily: Aphodiinae
- Tribe: Odontolochini
- Genus: Saprolochus; Stebnicka & Galante, 2007

Genus of beetles

Saprolochus is a genus of beetles of the family Scarabaeidae.

== Species ==
- Saprolochus bolivarensis Stebnicka & Galante, 2007
- Saprolochus lobatus Skelley, 2007
- Saprolochus peruvianus Minkina, Skelley & Gama, 2025
- Saprolochus tambopatae Stebnicka & Galante, 2007
- Saprolochus tridentatus Skelley, 2007
- Saprolochus venezuelensis Minkina, Skelley & Gama, 2025
