= Saprolochus tridentatus =

Scientific classification
- Kingdom: Animalia
- Phylum: Arthropoda
- Clade: Pancrustacea
- Class: Insecta
- Order: Coleoptera
- Suborder: Polyphaga
- Infraorder: Scarabaeiformia
- Family: Scarabaeidae
- Genus: Saprolochus
- Species: S. tridentatus

Binomial name
- Saprolochus tridentatus Skelley, 2007

Species of beetle

Saprolochus tridentatus is a species of beetle of the family Scarabaeidae. It is found in Bolivia, Brazil (Acre) and Peru.

== Description ==
Adults reach a length of about 3.5–5.7 mm (0.14–0.22 in). The head is broad, strongly gibbous medially and coarsely punctate posteriorly. The clypeus is sinuate, with the anterior margin thickened medially, and downwardly bent with a big acuminate dentiform process. The pronotum is punctate, with finer punctures mixed with larger punctures and with a marginal line. The posterior angles have three dentiform processes. The elytra have weakly convex and shagreened interstriae. The striae are shallow and have somewhat quadrate punctures.

== Life history ==
Specimens were collected from rotten palm tree flowers and with flight intercept traps in rainforests.

== Etymology ==
The species name refers to the unique tridentate pronotal margin.
