= Odontolochus =

Scientific classification
- Kingdom: Animalia
- Phylum: Arthropoda
- Clade: Pancrustacea
- Class: Insecta
- Order: Coleoptera
- Suborder: Polyphaga
- Infraorder: Scarabaeiformia
- Family: Scarabaeidae
- Subfamily: Aphodiinae
- Tribe: Odontolochini
- Genus: Odontolochus; Schmidt, 1917

Synonyms
- Loeblietus Endrödi, 1979; Odontolochus (Anodontolochus) Paulian, 1942; Odontoderus Clouët, 1900

Genus of beetles

Odontolochus is a genus of beetles of the family Scarabaeidae.

== Species ==
- Odontolochus basilewskyi Endrödi, 1957
- Odontolochus burgeoni (Boucomont, 1930)
- Odontolochus costatus Endrödi, 1964
- Odontolochus ferenczi Endrödi, 1976
- Odontolochus gestroi (Clouët des Pesruches, 1900)
- Odontolochus lackneri Rakovič, Mencl & Král, 2014
- Odontolochus monteithi Stebnicka & Howden, 1996
- Odontolochus oberthuri (Clouët des Pesruches, 1900)
- Odontolochus paucus Schmidt, 1917
- Odontolochus raffrayi Paulian, 1942
- Odontolochus setulosus Endrödi, 1964
- Odontolochus spinicollis (Harold, 1871)
- Odontolochus villiersi Petrovitz, 1966
- Odontolochus weiri Stebnicka & Howden, 1996
