= Odontolochus basilewskyi =

Scientific classification
- Kingdom: Animalia
- Phylum: Arthropoda
- Clade: Pancrustacea
- Class: Insecta
- Order: Coleoptera
- Suborder: Polyphaga
- Infraorder: Scarabaeiformia
- Family: Scarabaeidae
- Genus: Odontolochus
- Species: O. basilewskyi

Binomial name
- Odontolochus basilewskyi Endrödi, 1957

Synonyms
- Odontolochus basilevskyi

Species of beetle

Odontolochus basilewskyi is a species of beetle of the family Scarabaeidae. It is found in the Democratic Republic of the Congo.

== Description ==
Adults reach a length of about 3–3.5 mm (0.12–0.14 in). They have a castaneous, shiny, glabrous body.
