= Saprositellus peruanus =

Scientific classification
- Kingdom: Animalia
- Phylum: Arthropoda
- Clade: Pancrustacea
- Class: Insecta
- Order: Coleoptera
- Suborder: Polyphaga
- Infraorder: Scarabaeiformia
- Family: Scarabaeidae
- Genus: Saprositellus
- Species: S. peruanus

Binomial name
- Saprositellus peruanus Stebnicka, 2003

Species of beetle

Saprositellus peruanus is a species of beetle of the family Scarabaeidae. It is found in Peru.

== Description ==
Adults reach a length of about 3.2 mm (0.13 in). They have an elongate-oval, piceous black body, with the legs dark brown and with a microreticulate surface.

== Etymology ==
The species name is derived from the name of the country where it was discovered.
