= Stebnickiella =

Scientific classification
- Kingdom: Animalia
- Phylum: Arthropoda
- Clade: Pancrustacea
- Class: Insecta
- Order: Coleoptera
- Suborder: Polyphaga
- Infraorder: Scarabaeiformia
- Family: Scarabaeidae
- Subfamily: Aphodiinae
- Tribe: Odontolochini
- Genus: Stebnickiella; Skelley, 2007
- Species: S. zosterixys

Binomial name
- Stebnickiella zosterixys Skelley, 2007

Genus of beetles

Stebnickiella is a genus of beetle of the family Scarabaeidae. It is monotypic, being represented by the single species, Stebnickiella zosterixys, which is found in Brazil (Amazonas), Colombia and Peru.

== Description ==
Adults reach a length of about 3.3 mm (0.13 in). The body is piceous, oval, strongly convex and reddish brown. The head is wider than the elytra and finely punctate and the clypeus is inconspicuously sinuate, with the margin thickened medially. The pronotum is strongly tumid anteriorly and the disc is densely and finely punctate. The lateral margin is explanate and the posterior margin has rows of coarse, wide punctures. The elytra are oval and convex and have a small humeral tooth. The interstriae are weakly convex and the striae are deep.

== Life history ==
Specimens were collected with flight intercept traps in tropical rainforests.
