= Saprolochus bolivarensis =

Scientific classification
- Kingdom: Animalia
- Phylum: Arthropoda
- Clade: Pancrustacea
- Class: Insecta
- Order: Coleoptera
- Suborder: Polyphaga
- Infraorder: Scarabaeiformia
- Family: Scarabaeidae
- Genus: Saprolochus
- Species: S. bolivarensis

Binomial name
- Saprolochus bolivarensis Stebnicka & Galante, 2007

Species of beetle

Saprolochus bolivarensis is a species of beetle of the family Scarabaeidae. It is found in Venezuela.

== Description ==
Adults reach a length of about 3.5–4 mm (0.14–0.16 in). They have a shiny, carbon black body.
