= Trichaphodius dudleyi =

Scientific classification
- Kingdom: Animalia
- Phylum: Arthropoda
- Clade: Pancrustacea
- Class: Insecta
- Order: Coleoptera
- Suborder: Polyphaga
- Infraorder: Scarabaeiformia
- Family: Scarabaeidae
- Genus: Trichaphodius
- Species: T. dudleyi

Binomial name
- Trichaphodius dudleyi (Bordat, 1985)

Synonyms
- Aphodius (Trichaphodius) dudleyi Bordat, 1985

Species of beetle

Trichaphodius dudleyi is a species of beetle of the family Scarabaeidae. It is found in Malawi.

== Description ==
Adults reach a length of about 4–4.1 mm (0.16–0.16 in). They are very similar to Trichaphodius lanuginosus.
