= Trichaphodius incisus =

Scientific classification
- Kingdom: Animalia
- Phylum: Arthropoda
- Clade: Pancrustacea
- Class: Insecta
- Order: Coleoptera
- Suborder: Polyphaga
- Infraorder: Scarabaeiformia
- Family: Scarabaeidae
- Genus: Trichaphodius
- Species: T. incisus

Binomial name
- Trichaphodius incisus (Petrovitz, 1969)

Synonyms
- Aphodius (Trichaphodius) incisus Petrovitz, 1969

Species of beetle

Trichaphodius incisus is a species of beetle of the family Scarabaeidae. It is found in the Democratic Republic of the Congo and South Africa.

== Description ==
Adults reach a length of about 3.6 mm (0.14 in). They are very similar to Trichaphodius schoutedeni, but may be distinguished by the deeply emarginate anterior margin of the clypeus.
