= Trichaphodius flavus =

Scientific classification
- Kingdom: Animalia
- Phylum: Arthropoda
- Clade: Pancrustacea
- Class: Insecta
- Order: Coleoptera
- Suborder: Polyphaga
- Infraorder: Scarabaeiformia
- Family: Scarabaeidae
- Genus: Trichaphodius
- Species: T. flavus

Binomial name
- Trichaphodius flavus Endrödi, 1955

Synonyms
- Aphodius (Trichaphodius) humilis ovatus Endrödi, 1957; Aphodius (Trichaphodius) ovatus decoloratus Endrödi, 1957; Aphodius (Trichaphodius) ovatus luctuosus Endrödi, 1957

Species of beetle

Trichaphodius flavus is a species of beetle of the family Scarabaeidae. It is found in Burkina Faso, Burundi, Cameroon, the Central African Republic, Chad, Ethiopia, Gabon, Gambia, Ghana, Guinea-Bissau, Ivory Coast, Kenya, Malawi, Mali, Mozambique, Namibia, Niger, Nigeria, the Democratic Republic of the Congo, Guinea, the Republic of the Congo, Senegal, Sierra Leone, Togo, Uganda, Zambia and Zimbabwe.

== Description ==
Adults reach a length of about 3–4 mm (0.12–0.16 in). They are very similar to Trichaphodius sigwalti.
