= Trichaphodius moorei =

Scientific classification
- Kingdom: Animalia
- Phylum: Arthropoda
- Clade: Pancrustacea
- Class: Insecta
- Order: Coleoptera
- Suborder: Polyphaga
- Infraorder: Scarabaeiformia
- Family: Scarabaeidae
- Genus: Trichaphodius
- Species: T. moorei

Binomial name
- Trichaphodius moorei (Paulian, 1936)

Synonyms
- Aphodius moorei Paulian, 1936

Species of beetle

Trichaphodius moorei is a species of dung beetle native to India (Goa, Rajasthan, West Bengal, Uttarakhand) and Sri Lanka.

== Description ==
Adults reach a length of about 3.5 mm (0.14 in). They have an elongate-oval, slightly convex, yellowish-brown body. The head, the center of the pronotum, and the disc of the elytra are darker brown. Before the apex, there is a light-colored spot with a darker border. The dorsal surface is covered with yellowish hairs.
