= Trichaphodius humilis =

Scientific classification
- Kingdom: Animalia
- Phylum: Arthropoda
- Clade: Pancrustacea
- Class: Insecta
- Order: Coleoptera
- Suborder: Polyphaga
- Infraorder: Scarabaeiformia
- Family: Scarabaeidae
- Genus: Trichaphodius
- Species: T. humilis

Binomial name
- Trichaphodius humilis (Roth, 1851)

Synonyms
- Aphodius humilis Roth, 1851

Species of beetle

Trichaphodius humilis is a species of beetle of the family Scarabaeidae. It is found in Burundi, Chad, Ethiopia, Ghana, Ivory Coast, Kenya, the Democratic Republic of the Congo, Guinea, the Republic of the Congo, Rwanda, Sudan and Tanzania.

== Description ==
Adults reach a length of about 3.2–4.1 mm (0.13–0.16 in). They have an oval-elongate, feebly convex, moderately shiny, pubescent, brown-yellowish body, with the disc of the pronotum and a band on the elytra darker.
