= Trichaphodius mysticus =

Scientific classification
- Kingdom: Animalia
- Phylum: Arthropoda
- Clade: Pancrustacea
- Class: Insecta
- Order: Coleoptera
- Suborder: Polyphaga
- Infraorder: Scarabaeiformia
- Family: Scarabaeidae
- Genus: Trichaphodius
- Species: T. mysticus

Binomial name
- Trichaphodius mysticus (Bordat, 1989)

Synonyms
- Aphodius (Trichaphodius) mysticus Bordat, 1989

Species of beetle

Trichaphodius mysticus is a species of beetle of the family Scarabaeidae. It is found in Kenya.

== Description ==
Adults reach a length of about 3.6–4.3 mm (0.14–0.17 in). They have an elongate, somewhat shiny body. The head and pronotum are dark brown, with the sides of the clypeus and the lateral margins of the pronotum brownish-yellow. The elytra are brownish-yellow, with a basal spot, a large discal patch and the apex dark brown. There is an even darker band on either side of the preapical spot. The legs are brown.
