= Trichaphodius punctiger =

Scientific classification
- Kingdom: Animalia
- Phylum: Arthropoda
- Clade: Pancrustacea
- Class: Insecta
- Order: Coleoptera
- Suborder: Polyphaga
- Infraorder: Scarabaeiformia
- Family: Scarabaeidae
- Genus: Trichaphodius
- Species: T. punctiger

Binomial name
- Trichaphodius punctiger (Endrödi, 1957)

Synonyms
- Aphodius (Trichaphodius) humilis punctiger Endrödi, 1957; Aphodius (Trichaphodius) ovatus nigrellus Endrödi, 1957

Species of beetle

Trichaphodius punctiger is a species of beetle of the family Scarabaeidae. It is found in Cameroon, Ghana, Kenya, the Democratic Republic of the Congo and Tanzania.

== Description ==
Adults reach a length of about 3.6–4.5 mm (0.14–0.18 in).
