= Trichaphodius leoninus =

Scientific classification
- Kingdom: Animalia
- Phylum: Arthropoda
- Clade: Pancrustacea
- Class: Insecta
- Order: Coleoptera
- Suborder: Polyphaga
- Infraorder: Scarabaeiformia
- Family: Scarabaeidae
- Genus: Trichaphodius
- Species: T. leoninus

Binomial name
- Trichaphodius leoninus (Schmidt, 1910)

Synonyms
- Aphodius leoninus Schmidt, 1910

Species of beetle

Trichaphodius leoninus is a species of beetle of the family Scarabaeidae. It is found in Kenya, the Democratic Republic of the Congo, South Africa, Rwanda and Madagascar.

== Description ==
Adults reach a length of about 4 mm (0.16 in). They have a slightly convex, oblong, yellowish-brown body, with the back of the head and the disc of the pronotum darker. Before the apex of the elytra, there is a light-colored spot, bordered by dark margins both anteriorly and posteriorly.
