= Trichaphodius curvispina =

Scientific classification
- Kingdom: Animalia
- Phylum: Arthropoda
- Clade: Pancrustacea
- Class: Insecta
- Order: Coleoptera
- Suborder: Polyphaga
- Infraorder: Scarabaeiformia
- Family: Scarabaeidae
- Genus: Trichaphodius
- Species: T. curvispina

Binomial name
- Trichaphodius curvispina (Bordat, 1989)

Synonyms
- Aphodius (Trichaphodius) curvispina Bordat, 1989

Species of beetle

Trichaphodius curvispina is a species of beetle of the family Scarabaeidae. It is found in Ethiopia and Kenya.

== Description ==
Adults reach a length of about 3.3–4 mm (0.13–0.16 in). They have a silky, yellowish-brown body, with the disc of the pronotum, an anterior band bordering the preapical spot and the posterior part of the elytra darkened. The legs are light reddish-brown.
