= Trichaphodius copulatus =

Scientific classification
- Kingdom: Animalia
- Phylum: Arthropoda
- Clade: Pancrustacea
- Class: Insecta
- Order: Coleoptera
- Suborder: Polyphaga
- Infraorder: Scarabaeiformia
- Family: Scarabaeidae
- Genus: Trichaphodius
- Species: T. copulatus

Binomial name
- Trichaphodius copulatus (Schmidt, 1917)

Synonyms
- Aphodius copulatus Schmidt, 1917; Trichaphodius pseudocalcaratus Paulian, 1954; Aphodius connexus Klug, 1855

Species of beetle

Trichaphodius copulatus is a species of beetle of the family Scarabaeidae. It is found in Benin, Botswana, Burkina Faso, Cameroon, Ethiopia, Ivory Coast, Kenya, Malawi, Mozambique, Namibia, Niger, the Democratic Republic of the Congo, Senegal, Tanzania and Zambia.

== Description ==
Adults reach a length of about 3.25 mm (0.128 in). They are fuscous brown, with a light olivaceous tinge, slightly pale testaecous on the sides of the prothorax and having on each elytron a pale testaceous band.
