= Trichaphodius cantoti =

Scientific classification
- Kingdom: Animalia
- Phylum: Arthropoda
- Clade: Pancrustacea
- Class: Insecta
- Order: Coleoptera
- Suborder: Polyphaga
- Infraorder: Scarabaeiformia
- Family: Scarabaeidae
- Genus: Trichaphodius
- Species: T. cantoti

Binomial name
- Trichaphodius cantoti (Bordat, 1989)

Synonyms
- Aphodius (Trichaphodius) cantoti Bordat, 1989

Species of beetle

Trichaphodius cantoti is a species of beetle of the family Scarabaeidae. It is found in Mali, Malawi and the Democratic Republic of the Congo.

== Description ==
Adults reach a length of about 3.2–3.8 mm (0.13–0.15 in). Subspecies mycetophilus is bigger and may reach a length of about 4.3 mm (0.17 in). They have a shiny, dark brown body, with the sides of the head, the lateral margins of the pronotum, the scutellum, the basal margin of the elytra, and a preapical spot all light reddish-brown. The legs are reddish-brown.

== Subspecies ==
- Trichaphodius cantoti cantoti (Mali, Malawi)
- Trichaphodius cantoti mycetophilus (Bordat, 1989) (Democratic Republic of the Congo)
