= Trichaphodius =

Scientific classification
- Kingdom: Animalia
- Phylum: Arthropoda
- Clade: Pancrustacea
- Class: Insecta
- Order: Coleoptera
- Suborder: Polyphaga
- Infraorder: Scarabaeiformia
- Family: Scarabaeidae
- Tribe: Aphodiini
- Subtribe: Aphodiina
- Genus: Trichaphodius; Schmidt, 1914

Synonyms
- Aphodius (Trichaphodius) Schmidt, 1914; Strongylothorax Motschulsky, 1859

Genus of beetles

Trichaphodius is a genus of beetles of the family Scarabaeidae.

== Species ==
- Trichaphodius amplitarsis (Bordat, 1989)
- Trichaphodius bellonatus (Balthasar, 1941)
- Trichaphodius calcaratoides Paulian, 1942
- Trichaphodius cantaloubei (Bordat, 1992)
- Trichaphodius cantoti (Bordat, 1989)
- Trichaphodius copulatus (Schmidt, 1917)
- Trichaphodius curvispina (Bordat, 1989)
- Trichaphodius divisus (Schmidt, 1908)
- Trichaphodius dudleyi (Bordat, 1985)
- Trichaphodius flavus Endrödi, 1955
- Trichaphodius fumosulus (Endrödi, 1957)
- Trichaphodius globosus Bordat, 2013
- Trichaphodius gorillae Bordat, 1989
- Trichaphodius hindustanicus (Balthasar, 1935)
- Trichaphodius humilis (Roth, 1851)
- Trichaphodius incisus (Petrovitz, 1969)
- Trichaphodius jirianus (Balthasar, 1965)
- Trichaphodius kachovskyi (Koshantschikov, 1916)
- Trichaphodius kanemicus (Endrödi, 1976)
- Trichaphodius lanuginosus (Péringuey, 1901)
- Trichaphodius leoninus (Schmidt, 1910)
- Trichaphodius longus (Schmidt, 1912)
- Trichaphodius maldesi (Bordat, 1989)
- Trichaphodius meruanus (Balthasar, 1967)
- Trichaphodius misellus (Boheman, 1857)
- Trichaphodius moorei (Paulian, 1936)
- Trichaphodius mysticus (Bordat, 1989)
- Trichaphodius niloticus (Petrovitz, 1967)
- Trichaphodius obvius Endrödi, 1964
- Trichaphodius okeani (Bordat, 1992)
- Trichaphodius paradivisus (Balthasar, 1960)
- Trichaphodius pseudocopulatus (Bordat, 1997)
- Trichaphodius pseudohumilis (Bordat, 1989)
- Trichaphodius pseudoleoninus (Bordat, 1997)
- Trichaphodius punctiger (Endrödi, 1957)
- Trichaphodius quadripartitus (Petrovitz, 1973)
- Trichaphodius sangha Bordat, 2023
- Trichaphodius schoutedeni (Boucomont, 1928)
- Trichaphodius serrulatus (Quedenfeldt, 1884)
- Trichaphodius sigwalti (Bordat, 1989)
- Trichaphodius sipeki Rakovič, Král & Mencl, 2016
