= Trichaphodius fumosulus =

Scientific classification
- Kingdom: Animalia
- Phylum: Arthropoda
- Clade: Pancrustacea
- Class: Insecta
- Order: Coleoptera
- Suborder: Polyphaga
- Infraorder: Scarabaeiformia
- Family: Scarabaeidae
- Genus: Trichaphodius
- Species: T. fumosulus

Binomial name
- Trichaphodius fumosulus (Endrödi, 1957)

Synonyms
- Aphodius (Trichaphodius) humilis fumosulus Endrödi, 1957

Species of beetle

Trichaphodius fumosulus is a species of beetle of the family Scarabaeidae. It is found in Kenya, Malawi, Mozambique, the Democratic Republic of the Congo and Tanzania.

== Description ==
Adults reach a length of about 3.4–4.2 mm (0.13–0.17 in). They are characterized by their generally rather dark coloration and a preapical spot that is sometimes invisible.
