= Trichaphodius amplitarsis =

Scientific classification
- Kingdom: Animalia
- Phylum: Arthropoda
- Clade: Pancrustacea
- Class: Insecta
- Order: Coleoptera
- Suborder: Polyphaga
- Infraorder: Scarabaeiformia
- Family: Scarabaeidae
- Genus: Trichaphodius
- Species: T. amplitarsis

Binomial name
- Trichaphodius amplitarsis (Bordat, 1989)

Synonyms
- Aphodius (Trichaphodius) amplitarsis Bordat, 1989

Species of beetle

Trichaphodius amplitarsis is a species of beetle of the family Scarabaeidae. It is found in Chad, Mali and Senegal.

== Description ==
Adults reach a length of about 3.7–4.1 mm (0.15–0.16 in). They have a shiny body, with the head and pronotum dark brown, with the sides of the head and lateral margins of the pronotum lighter. The elytra are yellowish-brown with a transverse preapical spot, bordered anteriorly and posteriorly by a dark brown transverse band. There is also a light yellowish-brown humeral spot and the striae are darkened. The legs are yellowish-brown.
