= Trichaphodius kachovskyi =

Scientific classification
- Kingdom: Animalia
- Phylum: Arthropoda
- Clade: Pancrustacea
- Class: Insecta
- Order: Coleoptera
- Suborder: Polyphaga
- Infraorder: Scarabaeiformia
- Family: Scarabaeidae
- Genus: Trichaphodius
- Species: T. kachovskyi

Binomial name
- Trichaphodius kachovskyi (Koshantschikov, 1916)

Synonyms
- Aphodius (Trichaphodius) kachovskyi Koshantschikov, 1916

Species of beetle

Trichaphodius kachovskyi is a species of beetle of the family Scarabaeidae. It is found in Ethiopia.

== Description ==
Adults reach a length of about 4.2–4.6 mm (0.17–0.18 in). The pronotum is blackish-brown, with the anterior angles yellowish-brown. The elytra are yellowish-brown, but darker along the sides, with two rows of hairs and dull at the base.
