= Trichaphodius gorillae =

Scientific classification
- Kingdom: Animalia
- Phylum: Arthropoda
- Clade: Pancrustacea
- Class: Insecta
- Order: Coleoptera
- Suborder: Polyphaga
- Infraorder: Scarabaeiformia
- Family: Scarabaeidae
- Genus: Trichaphodius
- Species: T. gorillae

Binomial name
- Trichaphodius gorillae (Bordat, 1989)

Synonyms
- Aphodius (Trichaphodius) gorillae Bordat, 1989

Species of beetle

Trichaphodius gorillae is a species of beetle of the family Scarabaeidae. It is found in the Democratic Republic of the Congo.

== Description ==
Adults reach a length of about 3.9–4.1 mm (0.15–0.16 in). They have a shiny body, with the head and pronotum brownish-black and with a small spot on each side of the clypeus. The lateral margins of the pronotum are brownish-yellow and the scutellum and elytra are dark brown, the latter with some brownish-yellow areas. The legs are reddish-brown.

== Life history ==
Specimens have been collected from gorilla excrement.
