= Trichaphodius globosus =

Scientific classification
- Kingdom: Animalia
- Phylum: Arthropoda
- Clade: Pancrustacea
- Class: Insecta
- Order: Coleoptera
- Suborder: Polyphaga
- Infraorder: Scarabaeiformia
- Family: Scarabaeidae
- Genus: Trichaphodius
- Species: T. globosus

Binomial name
- Trichaphodius globosus Bordat, 2013

Species of beetle

Trichaphodius globosus is a species of beetle of the family Scarabaeidae. It is found in Senegal.

== Description ==
Adults reach a length of about 3 mm (0.12 in). They have a distinctly convex, dark reddish-brown, shiny body. The anterior part of the clypeus and the anterior angles of the pronotum are lighter. They are entirely pubescent. The legs are reddish-brown.

== Etymology ==
The species name refers to its strongly convex appearance.
