= Trichaphodius quadripartitus =

Scientific classification
- Kingdom: Animalia
- Phylum: Arthropoda
- Clade: Pancrustacea
- Class: Insecta
- Order: Coleoptera
- Suborder: Polyphaga
- Infraorder: Scarabaeiformia
- Family: Scarabaeidae
- Genus: Trichaphodius
- Species: T. quadripartitus

Binomial name
- Trichaphodius quadripartitus (Petrovitz, 1973)

Synonyms
- Aphodius (Trichaphodius) quadripartitus Petrovitz, 1973

Species of beetle

Trichaphodius quadripartitus is a species of beetle of the family Scarabaeidae. It is found in Brazil (Paraná, Rio Grande do Sul, São Paulo).

== Description ==
Adults reach a length of about 6 mm (0.24 in). The body is convex and almost glabrous. The head is punctate with the clypeus truncate. The pronotum is convex, without a posterior marginal line and with punctures of two sizes. The larger punctures are concentrated on the sides, while the smaller, finer punctures are densely distributed across the surface. The elytra are strongly alutaceous with a lighter spot at the posterior declivity. The interstriae are weakly convex, alutaceous, and finely punctured. The metatibiae have the apical and lateral margin fringed by setae which become progressively longer closer to the lateral margin.
