= Trichaphodius maldesi =

Scientific classification
- Kingdom: Animalia
- Phylum: Arthropoda
- Clade: Pancrustacea
- Class: Insecta
- Order: Coleoptera
- Suborder: Polyphaga
- Infraorder: Scarabaeiformia
- Family: Scarabaeidae
- Genus: Trichaphodius
- Species: T. maldesi

Binomial name
- Trichaphodius maldesi (Bordat, 1989)

Synonyms
- Aphodius (Trichaphodius) maldesi Bordat, 1989

Species of beetle

Trichaphodius maldesi is a species of beetle of the family Scarabaeidae. It is found in Cameroon, Gabon, Ghana, Ivory Coast, the Democratic Republic of the Congo, Guinea, Senegal and Togo.

== Description ==
Adults reach a length of about 3.3–3.7 mm (0.13–0.15 in). They are slightly shiny. The head and pronotum are yellowish-brown with the sides lighter. The scutellum is yellowish-brown and the elytra are dark brown, with the base of interstriae 2, 3, and sometimes 4, a humeral spot, a preapical spot, and the apex yellowish-brown. The legs are also yellowish-brown.
