= Trichaphodius pseudohumilis =

Scientific classification
- Kingdom: Animalia
- Phylum: Arthropoda
- Clade: Pancrustacea
- Class: Insecta
- Order: Coleoptera
- Suborder: Polyphaga
- Infraorder: Scarabaeiformia
- Family: Scarabaeidae
- Genus: Trichaphodius
- Species: T. pseudohumilis

Binomial name
- Trichaphodius pseudohumilis (Bordat, 1989)

Synonyms
- Aphodius (Trichaphodius) pseudohumilis Bordat, 1989

Species of beetle

Trichaphodius pseudohumilis is a species of beetle of the family Scarabaeidae. It is found in South Africa (Free State, KwaZulu-Natal, Transvaal).

== Description ==
Adults reach a length of about 3.5–4.3 mm (0.14–0.17 in). They fairly shiny body. The head and pronotum are brown, with the lateral margins of the head and pronotum brownish-yellow. The elytra are brownish-yellow, with a large discal spot, a darker apex and two less distinct brownish-black bands. The legs are brownish-yellow.
