= Trichaphodius kanemicus =

Scientific classification
- Kingdom: Animalia
- Phylum: Arthropoda
- Clade: Pancrustacea
- Class: Insecta
- Order: Coleoptera
- Suborder: Polyphaga
- Infraorder: Scarabaeiformia
- Family: Scarabaeidae
- Genus: Trichaphodius
- Species: T. kanemicus

Binomial name
- Trichaphodius kanemicus (Endrödi, 1976)

Synonyms
- Aphodius (Trichaphodius) kanemicus Endrödi, 1976; Aphodius (Trichaphodius) tchadensis Endrödi, 1964

Species of beetle

Trichaphodius kanemicus is a species of beetle of the family Scarabaeidae. It is found in Benin, Cameroon, Chad, Ethiopia, Ghana, Ivory Coast, Kenya, Malawi, Mali, Mozambique, the Democratic Republic of the Congo, Senegal, Tanzania and Zimbabwe.

== Description ==
Adults reach a length of about 3.7–4.1 mm (0.15–0.16 in). They are characterized by a slightly emarginate clypeus anteriorly and by the terminal spur of the fore tibiae, which is broadened at the apex.
