= Trichaphodius divisus =

Scientific classification
- Kingdom: Animalia
- Phylum: Arthropoda
- Clade: Pancrustacea
- Class: Insecta
- Order: Coleoptera
- Suborder: Polyphaga
- Infraorder: Scarabaeiformia
- Family: Scarabaeidae
- Genus: Trichaphodius
- Species: T. divisus

Binomial name
- Trichaphodius divisus (Schmidt, 1908)

Synonyms
- Aphodius divisus Schmidt, 1908

Species of beetle

Trichaphodius divisus is a species of beetle of the family Scarabaeidae. It is found in Australia (South Australia, Tasmania, Victoria), Namibia, South Africa and Tanzania.

== Description ==
Adults reach a length of about 4–5.5 mm (0.16–0.22 in). They have a shining, pale yellow body, with part of the head, the disc of the pronotum and sutural elytral intervals brownish. The club of the antennae and the legs are yellow.
