= Trichaphodius lanuginosus =

Scientific classification
- Kingdom: Animalia
- Phylum: Arthropoda
- Clade: Pancrustacea
- Class: Insecta
- Order: Coleoptera
- Suborder: Polyphaga
- Infraorder: Scarabaeiformia
- Family: Scarabaeidae
- Genus: Trichaphodius
- Species: T. lanuginosus

Binomial name
- Trichaphodius lanuginosus (Péringuey, 1901)

Synonyms
- Aphodius lanuginosus Péringuey, 1901

Species of beetle

Trichaphodius lanuginosus is a species of beetle of the family Scarabaeidae. It is found in Zimbabwe.

== Description ==
Adults reach a length of about 3.7–4 mm (0.15–0.16 in). They are light olivaceous fuscous, with the sides of the prothorax, the alternate intervals of the elytra in the dorsal part, as well as a transverse, bi-sinuate posterior band on each elytron flavous.
