= Trichaphodius sigwalti =

Scientific classification
- Kingdom: Animalia
- Phylum: Arthropoda
- Clade: Pancrustacea
- Class: Insecta
- Order: Coleoptera
- Suborder: Polyphaga
- Infraorder: Scarabaeiformia
- Family: Scarabaeidae
- Genus: Trichaphodius
- Species: T. sigwalti

Binomial name
- Trichaphodius sigwalti (Bordat, 1989)

Synonyms
- Aphodius (Trichaphodius) sigwalti Bordat, 1989

Species of beetle

Trichaphodius sigwalti is a species of beetle of the family Scarabaeidae. It is found in Benin, Niger, Senegal, Sudan and Togo.

== Description ==
Adults reach a length of about 2.9–3.3 mm (0.11–0.13 in). They have a convex body, with a dull luster. They are entirely brownish-orange, sometimes with the disc of the head and pronotum, as well as a preapical spot on the elytra dark brown. The legs are reddish-brown.
