= Trichaphodius schoutedeni =

Scientific classification
- Kingdom: Animalia
- Phylum: Arthropoda
- Clade: Pancrustacea
- Class: Insecta
- Order: Coleoptera
- Suborder: Polyphaga
- Infraorder: Scarabaeiformia
- Family: Scarabaeidae
- Genus: Trichaphodius
- Species: T. schoutedeni

Binomial name
- Trichaphodius schoutedeni (Boucomont, 1928)

Synonyms
- Aphodius (Trichaphodius) schoutedeni Boucomont, 1928

Species of beetle

Trichaphodius schoutedeni is a species of beetle of the family Scarabaeidae. It is found in Cameroon, Gabon, Ivory Coast, the Democratic Republic of the Congo, Guinea, the Republic of the Congo, Rwanda, Tanzania and Togo.

== Description ==
Adults reach a length of about 3.3–3.8 mm (0.13–0.15 in). They have a convex, dark body. The inner margin of the fore tibiae of the males is broadly curved.
