= Erytus =

Erytus may refer to:

- Eurytus, the name of several characters in Greek mythology
- Erytus (beetle), a genus of beetles in the family Aphodiidae
