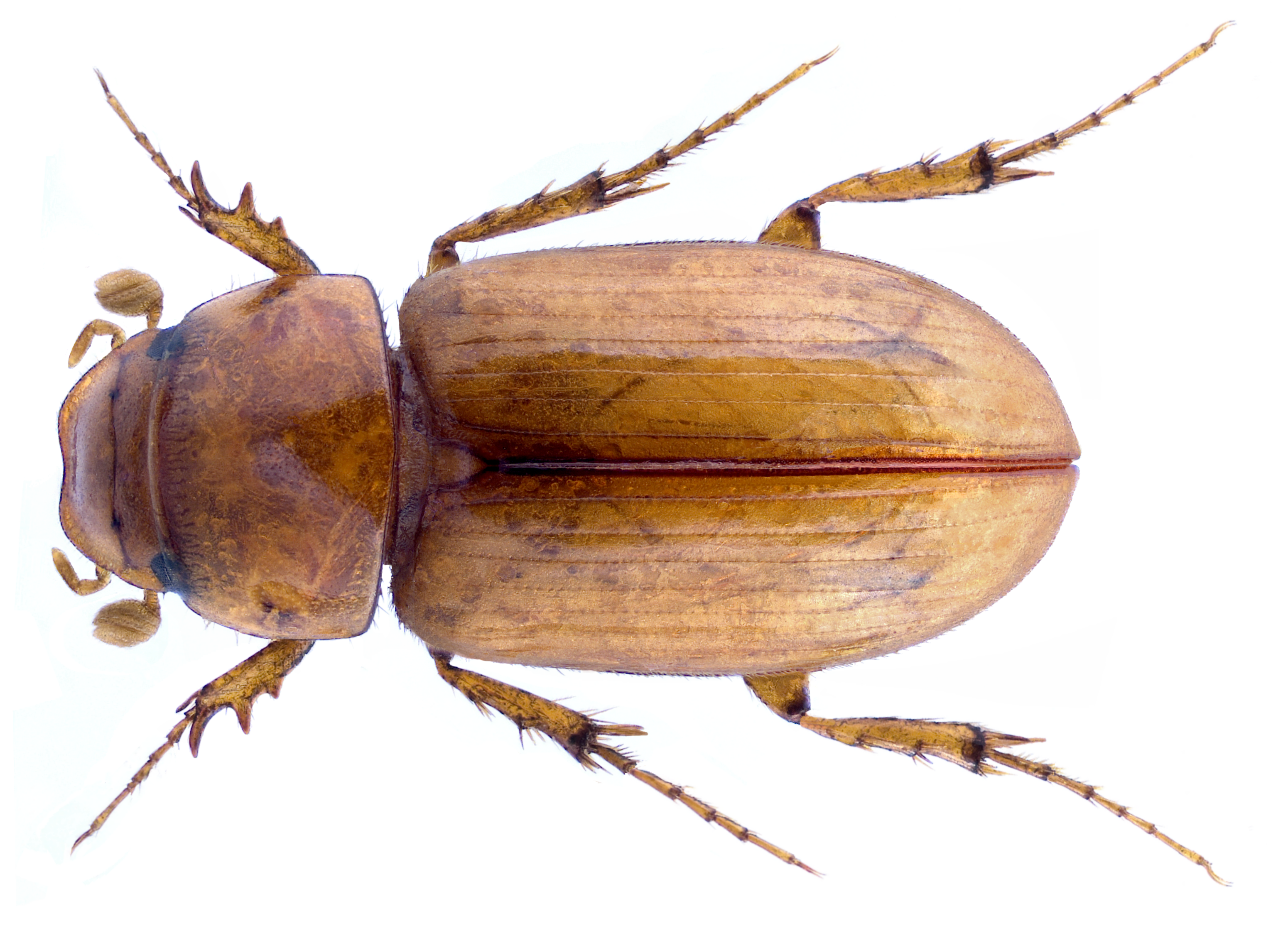

Scientific classification
- Kingdom: Animalia
- Phylum: Arthropoda
- Clade: Pancrustacea
- Class: Insecta
- Order: Coleoptera
- Suborder: Polyphaga
- Infraorder: Scarabaeiformia
- Family: Scarabaeidae
- Genus: Erytus
- Species: E. bucharicus

Binomial name
- Erytus bucharicus (Petrovitz, 1961)

Synonyms
- Aphodius (Erytus) bucharicus Petrovitz, 1961

= Erytus bucharicus =

Species of beetle

Erytus bucharicus is a species of beetle of the family Scarabaeidae. It is found in Afghanistan, Iran, Pakistan, Saudi Arabia, Turkmenistan and Uzbekistan.

== Description ==
Adults reach a length of about 5–6.5 mm (0.20–0.26 in). They have a shining, yellowish or light brown body, with the frontal and elytral suture darkened.
