= Erytus cognatus =

Scientific classification
- Kingdom: Animalia
- Phylum: Arthropoda
- Clade: Pancrustacea
- Class: Insecta
- Order: Coleoptera
- Suborder: Polyphaga
- Infraorder: Scarabaeiformia
- Family: Scarabaeidae
- Genus: Erytus
- Species: E. cognatus

Binomial name
- Erytus cognatus (Fairmaire, 1860)

Synonyms
- Aphodius (Erytus) cognatus Fairmaire, 1860; Aphodius klugi Schmidt, 1910; Aphodius unicolor Lucas, 1846; Aphodius brunneus Klug, 1830

Species of beetle

Erytus cognatus is a species of beetle of the family Scarabaeidae. It is found in Afghanistan, Algeria, Armenia, the Canary Islands, Cyprus, Egypt, Iran, Israel, Italy (Sicily), Kazakhstan, Kyrgyzstan, Kuwait, Lebanon, Libya, Morocco, Russia, Spain, Syria, Tajikistan, Tunisia, Turkey, Turkmenistan and Uzbekistan.

== Description ==
Adults reach a length of about 5–6 mm (0.20–0.24 in). They have an elongate, moderately convex, subcylindrical, shiny, nearly glabrous, brownish-red body.
