= Erytus persicus =

Scientific classification
- Kingdom: Animalia
- Phylum: Arthropoda
- Clade: Pancrustacea
- Class: Insecta
- Order: Coleoptera
- Suborder: Polyphaga
- Infraorder: Scarabaeiformia
- Family: Scarabaeidae
- Genus: Erytus
- Species: E. persicus

Binomial name
- Erytus persicus (Petrovitz, 1961)

Synonyms
- Aphodius (Erytus) persicus Petrovitz, 1961

Species of beetle

Erytus persicus is a species of beetle of the family Scarabaeidae. It is found in Afghanistan, Iran, Kazakhstan, Russia and Turkey.

== Description ==
Adults reach a length of about 5.5–7 mm (0.22–0.28 in). They have a shining, yellowish-red or reddish-brown body, with the frontal and elytral suture and the disc of the pronotum darkened. The upper surface of the body has no setae.
