= Erytus psammophilus =

Scientific classification
- Kingdom: Animalia
- Phylum: Arthropoda
- Clade: Pancrustacea
- Class: Insecta
- Order: Coleoptera
- Suborder: Polyphaga
- Infraorder: Scarabaeiformia
- Family: Scarabaeidae
- Genus: Erytus
- Species: E. psammophilus

Binomial name
- Erytus psammophilus (Balthasar, 1941)

Synonyms
- Aphodius (Erytus) psammophilus Balthasar, 1941

Species of beetle

Erytus psammophilus is a species of beetle of the family Scarabaeidae. It is found in Algeria.

== Description ==
Adults reach a length of about 5 mm (0.20 in). They have a glabrous, light reddish-yellow body. The back of the head and the disc of the pronotum are somewhat darkened, while the elytral suture and the margins of the scutellum are blackened.
