= Erytus aequalis =

Scientific classification
- Kingdom: Animalia
- Phylum: Arthropoda
- Clade: Pancrustacea
- Class: Insecta
- Order: Coleoptera
- Suborder: Polyphaga
- Infraorder: Scarabaeiformia
- Family: Scarabaeidae
- Genus: Erytus
- Species: E. aequalis

Binomial name
- Erytus aequalis (Schmidt, 1907)

Synonyms
- Aphodius aequalis Schmidt, 1907; Aphodius (Bodilus) stepicola Balthasar, 1941; Aphodius nitidus Ballion, 1871

Species of beetle

Erytus aequalis is a species of beetle of the family Scarabaeidae. It is found in Afghanistan, Albania, Algeria, Armenia, Azerbaijan, Bulgaria, China (Xizang), Cyprus, France (Corsica), Greece, Iran, Iraq, Israel, Italy, Italy (Sardinia), Jordan, Kazakhstan, Kyrgyzstan, Montenegro, Mongolia, Romania, Russia, Saudi Arabia, Syria, Tajikistan, Tunisia, Turkey, Turkmenistan, Ukraine and Uzbekistan.

== Description ==
Adults reach a length of about 4.5–5.5 mm (0.18–0.22 in). They are light yellowish-brown, with the back of the head and the disc of the pronotum blackish-brown.
