= Erytus lindemannae =

Scientific classification
- Kingdom: Animalia
- Phylum: Arthropoda
- Clade: Pancrustacea
- Class: Insecta
- Order: Coleoptera
- Suborder: Polyphaga
- Infraorder: Scarabaeiformia
- Family: Scarabaeidae
- Genus: Erytus
- Species: E. lindemannae

Binomial name
- Erytus lindemannae (Balthasar, 1960)

Synonyms
- Aphodius (Erytus) lindemannae Balthasar, 1960; Aphodius (Erytus) mesopotamicus Petrovitz, 1961

Species of beetle

Erytus lindemannae is a species of beetle of the family Scarabaeidae. It is found in Iran, Iraq, Israel and Syria.

== Description ==
Adults reach a length of about 4.8–5.8 mm (0.19–0.23 in). They have a slender, glossy and glabrous body. The back of the head and the disc of the pronotum are dark brown and the elytra are chestnut-brown, with the suture darkened. The sutural interval and the margins of the elytra are lighter.
