= Erytus hormonzensis =

Scientific classification
- Kingdom: Animalia
- Phylum: Arthropoda
- Clade: Pancrustacea
- Class: Insecta
- Order: Coleoptera
- Suborder: Polyphaga
- Infraorder: Scarabaeiformia
- Family: Scarabaeidae
- Genus: Erytus
- Species: E. hormonzensis

Binomial name
- Erytus hormonzensis (Petrovitz, 1980)

Synonyms
- Aphodius (Erytus) hormonzensis Petrovitz, 1980

Species of beetle

Erytus hormonzensis is a species of beetle of the family Scarabaeidae. It is found in Iran, Iraq, Oman, Saudi Arabia, the United Arab Emirates and Yemen.

== Description ==
Adults reach a length of about 4.5–5.5 mm (0.18–0.22 in). They have a shining, yellowish-brown body, with the frontal and elytral suture, anterior edge of the pronotum and sometimes also the disc of the pronotum darkened.
