= Erytus tekkensis =

Scientific classification
- Kingdom: Animalia
- Phylum: Arthropoda
- Clade: Pancrustacea
- Class: Insecta
- Order: Coleoptera
- Suborder: Polyphaga
- Infraorder: Scarabaeiformia
- Family: Scarabaeidae
- Genus: Erytus
- Species: E. tekkensis

Binomial name
- Erytus tekkensis (Petrovitz, 1961)

Synonyms
- Aphodius (Erytus) tekkensis Petrovitz, 1961

Species of beetle

Erytus tekkensis is a species of beetle of the family Scarabaeidae. It is found in Iran, Kyrgyzstan, Russia, Turkmenistan and Uzbekistan.

== Description ==
Adults reach a length of about 5.5–6 mm (0.22–0.24 in). They have a yellowish-brown body, with the sutural margin of the elytra somewhat darker.
