= Erytus opacior =

Scientific classification
- Kingdom: Animalia
- Phylum: Arthropoda
- Clade: Pancrustacea
- Class: Insecta
- Order: Coleoptera
- Suborder: Polyphaga
- Infraorder: Scarabaeiformia
- Family: Scarabaeidae
- Genus: Erytus
- Species: E. opacior

Binomial name
- Erytus opacior (Koshantschikov, 1894)

Synonyms
- Aphodius opacior Koshantschikov, 1894; Aphodius (Erytus) irakensis Baraud, 1977; Aphodius (Erytus) opacus Reitter, 1892

Species of beetle

Erytus opacior is a species of beetle of the family Scarabaeidae. It is found in Algeria, Egypt, Iran, Iraq, Israel, Jordan, Libya, Morocco, Saudi Arabia and Tunisia.

== Description ==
Adults reach a length of about 5–6 mm (0.20–0.24 in). They have a light yellowish-brown, dull body. The tips of the elytra have very fine, short, light-colored hairs.
