= Erytus transcaspicus =

Scientific classification
- Kingdom: Animalia
- Phylum: Arthropoda
- Clade: Pancrustacea
- Class: Insecta
- Order: Coleoptera
- Suborder: Polyphaga
- Infraorder: Scarabaeiformia
- Family: Scarabaeidae
- Genus: Erytus
- Species: E. transcaspicus

Binomial name
- Erytus transcaspicus (Petrovitz, 1961)

Synonyms
- Aphodius (Erytus) transcaspicus Petrovitz, 1961

Species of beetle

Erytus transcaspicus is a species of beetle of the family Scarabaeidae. It is found in Pakistan, Turkmenistan and Uzbekistan.

== Description ==
Adults reach a length of about 4–5.5 mm (0.16–0.22 in). They have a shining, yellow or yellowish-brown body, with the frontal suture and the anterior edge of the pronotum darkened. The elytra are covered with short yellow setae.
