= Erytus pruinosus =

Scientific classification
- Kingdom: Animalia
- Phylum: Arthropoda
- Clade: Pancrustacea
- Class: Insecta
- Order: Coleoptera
- Suborder: Polyphaga
- Infraorder: Scarabaeiformia
- Family: Scarabaeidae
- Genus: Erytus
- Species: E. pruinosus

Binomial name
- Erytus pruinosus (Reitter, 1892)

Synonyms
- Aphodius pruinosus Reitter, 1892; Aphodius (Erytus) buettikeri Paulian, 1980

Species of beetle

Erytus pruinosus is a species of beetle of the family Scarabaeidae. It is found in Afghanistan, Algeria, Egypt, Iran, Iraq, Israel, Kazakhstan, Kyrgyzstan, Lebanon, Libya, Mauretania, Morocco, Oman, Pakistan, Russia, Saudi Arabia, Tajikistan, Tunisia, Turkmenistan, the United Arab Emirates and Uzbekistan.

== Description ==
Adults reach a length of about 3–5 mm (0.12–0.20 in).
