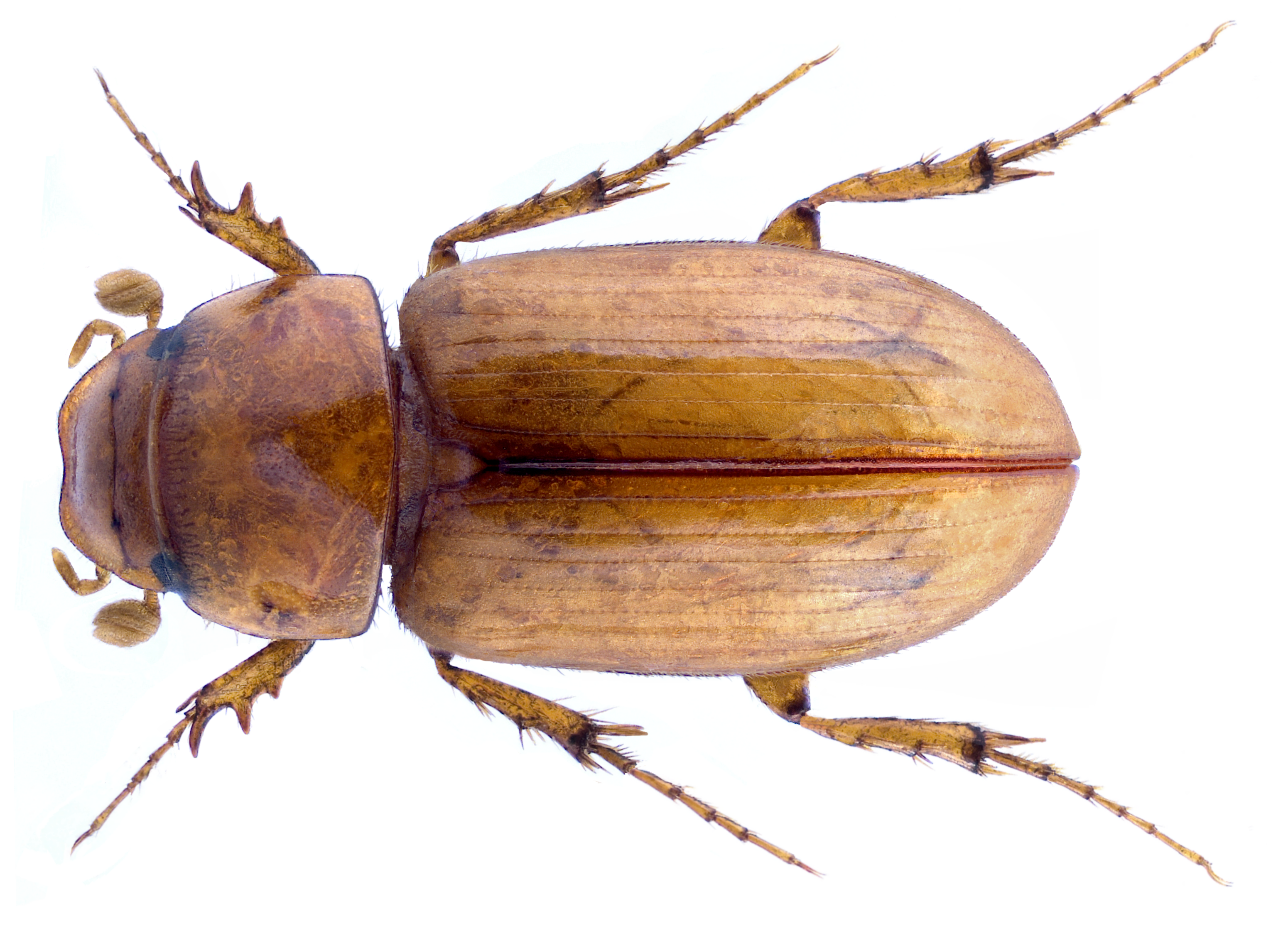
- Erytus bucharicus, Kazakhstan

Scientific classification
- Kingdom: Animalia
- Phylum: Arthropoda
- Clade: Pancrustacea
- Class: Insecta
- Order: Coleoptera
- Suborder: Polyphaga
- Infraorder: Scarabaeiformia
- Family: Scarabaeidae
- Subfamily: Aphodiinae
- Tribe: Aphodiini
- Genus: Erytus; Mulsant & Rey, 1870

Synonyms
- Aphodius (Erytus) Mulsant & Rey, 1870; Eryptus Mulsant & Rey, 1871

= Erytus (beetle) =

Genus of beetles

Erytus is a genus of dung beetles in the subfamily Aphodiinae. There are about 11 described species in Erytus.

== Species ==
- Erytus aequalis (Schmidt, 1907)
- Erytus bucharicus (Petrovitz, 1961)
- Erytus cognatus (Fairmaire, 1860)
- Erytus hormonzensis (Petrovitz, 1980)
- Erytus lindemannae (Balthasar, 1960)
- Erytus opacior (Koshantschikov, 1894)
- Erytus persicus (Petrovitz, 1961)
- Erytus pruinosus (Reitter, 1892)
- Erytus psammophilus (Balthasar, 1941)
- Erytus tekkensis (Petrovitz, 1961)
- Erytus transcaspicus (Petrovitz, 1961)
