= Aparammoecius gansuensis =

Scientific classification
- Kingdom: Animalia
- Phylum: Arthropoda
- Clade: Pancrustacea
- Class: Insecta
- Order: Coleoptera
- Suborder: Polyphaga
- Infraorder: Scarabaeiformia
- Family: Scarabaeidae
- Genus: Aparammoecius
- Species: A. gansuensis

Binomial name
- Aparammoecius gansuensis (Stebnicka, 1997)

Synonyms
- Aphodius (Aparammoecius) gansuensis Stebnicka, 1997

Species of beetle

Aparammoecius gansuensis is a species of beetle of the family Scarabaeidae. It is found in China (Gansu).

== Description ==
Adults reach a length of about 4.2–4.3 mm (0.17–0.17 in). They have an oblong-oval, moderately convex, subopaque, piceous body, with the elytral suture and apex reddish, the latter also has tiny hairs.
