= Aparammoecius =

Scientific classification
- Kingdom: Animalia
- Phylum: Arthropoda
- Clade: Pancrustacea
- Class: Insecta
- Order: Coleoptera
- Suborder: Polyphaga
- Infraorder: Scarabaeiformia
- Family: Scarabaeidae
- Subfamily: Aphodiinae
- Tribe: Aphodiini
- Genus: Aparammoecius; Petrovitz, 1958

Synonyms
- Aphodius (Aparammoecius) Petrovitz, 1958; Aphodius (Paremadus) Nakane, 1967

Genus of beetles

Aparammoecius is a genus of beetles of the family Scarabaeidae.

== Species ==
- Aparammoecius annapurnae (Stebnicka, 1986)
- Aparammoecius bagmatiensis (Stebnicka, 1983)
- Aparammoecius balangensis (Petrovitz, 1958)
- Aparammoecius chuangkuohungi Masumoto, Kiuchi & Wang, 2017
- Aparammoecius gansuensis (Stebnicka, 1997)
- Aparammoecius heinzi (Pittino, 1997)
- Aparammoecius holzschuhi (Pittino, 1997)
- Aparammoecius isaburoi (Nakane, 1956)
- Aparammoecius ivani (Stebnicka, 1989)
- Aparammoecius kanglae (Stebnicka, 1990)
- Aparammoecius kaskiensis (Ahrens & Stebnicka, 1997)
- Aparammoecius lamjungi (Ahrens & Stebnicka, 1997)
- Aparammoecius leisteri (Medvedev, 1968)
- Aparammoecius mahriensis (Stebnicka, 1983)
- Aparammoecius mizo (Nakane, 1967)
- Aparammoecius mudukensis (Stebnicka, 1989)
- Aparammoecius muzaffarabadensis (Pittino, 1997)
- Aparammoecius nomurai (Stebnicka, 1986)
- Aparammoecius pallidiligonis (Waterhouse, 1875)
- Aparammoecius phulcokiensis (Stebnicka, 1986)
- Aparammoecius sabhae (Stebnicka, 1990)
- Aparammoecius schawalleri (Stebnicka, 1989)
- Aparammoecius shogranicus (Pittino, 1997)
- Aparammoecius tarokensis (Stebnicka, 1994)
- Aparammoecius topali (Pittino, 1997)
- Aparammoecius waniaramensis (Pittino, 1997)
- Aparammoecius yangricus (Stebnicka, 1986)
- Aparammoecius yaralensis (Stebnicka, 1986)
- Aparammoecius yenpingensis Stebnicka, 1986
- Aparammoecius yushanus Masumoto, Kiuchi & Wang, 2017
- Aparammoecius zojilae (Stebnicka, 1981)
