= Aparammoecius mudukensis =

Scientific classification
- Kingdom: Animalia
- Phylum: Arthropoda
- Clade: Pancrustacea
- Class: Insecta
- Order: Coleoptera
- Suborder: Polyphaga
- Infraorder: Scarabaeiformia
- Family: Scarabaeidae
- Genus: Aparammoecius
- Species: A. mudukensis

Binomial name
- Aparammoecius mudukensis (Stebnicka, 1989)

Synonyms
- Aphodius (Paremadus) mudukensis Stebnicka, 1989

Species of beetle

Aparammoecius mudukensis is a species of beetle of the family Scarabaeidae. It is found in Pakistan.

== Description ==
Adults reach a length of about 4.3–4.5 mm (0.17–0.18 in). They have an oblong-oval, convex, shining, reddish black or black body.

== Etymology ==
The species is named after its type locality, Saiful Muduk Lake in the Kaghan valley (Pakistan).
