= Aparammoecius balangensis =

Scientific classification
- Kingdom: Animalia
- Phylum: Arthropoda
- Clade: Pancrustacea
- Class: Insecta
- Order: Coleoptera
- Suborder: Polyphaga
- Infraorder: Scarabaeiformia
- Family: Scarabaeidae
- Genus: Aparammoecius
- Species: A. balangensis

Binomial name
- Aparammoecius balangensis (Petrovitz, 1958)

Synonyms
- Aphodius (Aparammoecius) balangensis Petrovitz, 1958

Species of beetle

Aparammoecius balangensis is a species of beetle of the family Scarabaeidae. It is found in China (Sichuan).

== Description ==
Adults reach a length of about 4–4.5 mm (0.16–0.18 in). They have a brownish-black to black, shiny, glabrous body.
