= Aparammoecius annapurnae =

Scientific classification
- Kingdom: Animalia
- Phylum: Arthropoda
- Clade: Pancrustacea
- Class: Insecta
- Order: Coleoptera
- Suborder: Polyphaga
- Infraorder: Scarabaeiformia
- Family: Scarabaeidae
- Genus: Aparammoecius
- Species: A. annapurnae

Binomial name
- Aparammoecius annapurnae (Stebnicka, 1986)

Synonyms
- Aphodius (Paremadus) annapurnae Stebnicka, 1986

Species of beetle

Aparammoecius annapurnae is a species of beetle of the family Scarabaeidae. It is found in Nepal.

== Description ==
Adults reach a length of about 3.6–4.4 mm (0.14–0.17 in). They have an oblong-oval, moderately convex, shining body. The forebody is piceous, while the elytra are yellowish-brown. The legs are brown.
