= Aparammoecius isaburoi =

Scientific classification
- Kingdom: Animalia
- Phylum: Arthropoda
- Clade: Pancrustacea
- Class: Insecta
- Order: Coleoptera
- Suborder: Polyphaga
- Infraorder: Scarabaeiformia
- Family: Scarabaeidae
- Genus: Aparammoecius
- Species: A. isaburoi

Binomial name
- Aparammoecius isaburoi (Nakane, 1956)

Synonyms
- Aphodius (Emadus) isaburoi Nakane, 1956; Aphodius (Paremadus) masumotoi Nakane, 1967

Species of beetle

Aparammoecius isaburoi is a species of beetle of the family Scarabaeidae. It is found in Japan.

== Description ==
Adults reach a length of about 4–4.5 mm (0.16–0.18 in). They have an elongate-oval, strongly convex, shiny, glabrous, blackish body, with the margins of the clypeus, pronotum and elytra widely reddish. The legs are brown-reddish and the antennal club is blackish.
