= Aparammoecius kaskiensis =

Scientific classification
- Kingdom: Animalia
- Phylum: Arthropoda
- Clade: Pancrustacea
- Class: Insecta
- Order: Coleoptera
- Suborder: Polyphaga
- Infraorder: Scarabaeiformia
- Family: Scarabaeidae
- Genus: Aparammoecius
- Species: A. kaskiensis

Binomial name
- Aparammoecius kaskiensis (Ahrens & Stebnicka, 1997)

Synonyms
- Aphodius (Aparammoecius) kaskiensis Ahrens & Stebnicka, 1997

Species of beetle

Aparammoecius kaskiensis is a species of beetle of the family Scarabaeidae. It is found in Nepal.

== Description ==
Adults reach a length of about 4.2–5.5 mm (0.17–0.22 in). They have an oblong-oval, convex, shining, black body, mostly with the apex of the elytra reddish brown. The antennal club is dark.
