= Aparammoecius phulcokiensis =

Scientific classification
- Kingdom: Animalia
- Phylum: Arthropoda
- Clade: Pancrustacea
- Class: Insecta
- Order: Coleoptera
- Suborder: Polyphaga
- Infraorder: Scarabaeiformia
- Family: Scarabaeidae
- Genus: Aparammoecius
- Species: A. phulcokiensis

Binomial name
- Aparammoecius phulcokiensis (Stebnicka, 1986)

Synonyms
- Aphodius (Paremadus) phulcokiensis Stebnicka, 1986

Species of beetle

Aparammoecius phulcokiensis is a species of beetle of the family Scarabaeidae. It is found in Nepal.

== Description ==
Adults reach a length of about 3.7–4 mm (0.15–0.16 in). They have an oblong-oval, moderately shining body. The forebody is black, with the anterior of the head and the sides of the pronotum brownish. The elytra are brown with either yellow spots or with mixed yellow and dark spots. The legs are reddish-brown.
