= Aparammoecius pallidiligonis =

Scientific classification
- Kingdom: Animalia
- Phylum: Arthropoda
- Clade: Pancrustacea
- Class: Insecta
- Order: Coleoptera
- Suborder: Polyphaga
- Infraorder: Scarabaeiformia
- Family: Scarabaeidae
- Genus: Aparammoecius
- Species: A. pallidiligonis

Binomial name
- Aparammoecius pallidiligonis (Waterhouse, 1875)

Synonyms
- Aphodius pallidiligonis Waterhouse, 1875; Caelius nipponensis Balthasar, 1956

Species of beetle

Aparammoecius pallidiligonis is a species of beetle of the family Scarabaeidae. It is found in Japan.

== Description ==
Adults reach a length of about 4 mm (0.16 in). They are black, with the elytra light brown, with the 7th–10th intervals blackened, and with a streak-like mark at the base of the 3rd–4th intervals. The suture is darkened and the apex is reddish.
