= Aparammoecius schawalleri =

Scientific classification
- Kingdom: Animalia
- Phylum: Arthropoda
- Clade: Pancrustacea
- Class: Insecta
- Order: Coleoptera
- Suborder: Polyphaga
- Infraorder: Scarabaeiformia
- Family: Scarabaeidae
- Genus: Aparammoecius
- Species: A. schawalleri

Binomial name
- Aparammoecius schawalleri (Stebnicka, 1989)

Synonyms
- Aphodius (Paremadus) schawalleri Stebnicka, 1989

Species of beetle

Aparammoecius schawalleri is a species of beetle of the family Scarabaeidae. It is found in India (Jammu & Kashmir).

== Description ==
Adults reach a length of about 3.9–4 mm (0.15–0.16 in). They have an oval, convex, subopaque, black body, with the legs dark reddish.

== Etymology ==
The species is named in honour of Dr. Wolfgang Schawaller, one of the collectors of the species.
