= Aparammoecius ivani =

Scientific classification
- Kingdom: Animalia
- Phylum: Arthropoda
- Clade: Pancrustacea
- Class: Insecta
- Order: Coleoptera
- Suborder: Polyphaga
- Infraorder: Scarabaeiformia
- Family: Scarabaeidae
- Genus: Aparammoecius
- Species: A. ivani

Binomial name
- Aparammoecius ivani (Stebnicka, 1989)

Synonyms
- Aphodius (Paremadus) ivani Stebnicka, 1989

Species of beetle

Aparammoecius ivani is a species of beetle of the family Scarabaeidae. It is found in Pakistan.

== Description ==
Adults reach a length of about 3.8–4.1 mm (0.15–0.16 in). They have an oblong-oval, convex, subopaque, black or reddish-black body, with the legs reddish-black.

== Etymology ==
The species is named in honour of Dr. Ivan Löbl.
