= Aparammoecius tarokensis =

Scientific classification
- Kingdom: Animalia
- Phylum: Arthropoda
- Clade: Pancrustacea
- Class: Insecta
- Order: Coleoptera
- Suborder: Polyphaga
- Infraorder: Scarabaeiformia
- Family: Scarabaeidae
- Genus: Aparammoecius
- Species: A. tarokensis

Binomial name
- Aparammoecius tarokensis (Stebnicka, 1994)

Synonyms
- Aphodius (Aparammoecius) tarokensis Stebnicka, 1994; Aphodius (Paremadus) nishikawai Masumoto, 1996

Species of beetle

Aparammoecius tarokensis is a species of beetle of the family Scarabaeidae. It is found in Taiwan.

== Description ==
Adults reach a length of about 3.2–3.6 mm (0.13–0.14 in). They have an ovoid, strongly convex, shining, black body, with the margin of the clypeus, suture and apex of the elytra and legs dark reddish-brown. The antennal club is yellowish-brown.

== Etymology ==
The species is named after its type locality, the Taroko National Park (Taiwan).
