= Aparammoecius yenpingensis =

Scientific classification
- Kingdom: Animalia
- Phylum: Arthropoda
- Clade: Pancrustacea
- Class: Insecta
- Order: Coleoptera
- Suborder: Polyphaga
- Infraorder: Scarabaeiformia
- Family: Scarabaeidae
- Genus: Aparammoecius
- Species: A. yenpingensis

Binomial name
- Aparammoecius yenpingensis (Stebnicka, 1986)

Synonyms
- Aphodius (Paremadus) yenpingensis Stebnicka, 1986; Caelius chinensis Balthasar, 1945

Species of beetle

Aparammoecius yenpingensis is a species of beetle of the family Scarabaeidae. It is found in China (Fujian).

== Description ==
Adults reach a length of about 2.6 mm (0.10 in). They have a reddish-brown body is black, with the anterior of the head and the sides and the base of the pronotum lighter.
