= Aparammoecius nomurai =

Scientific classification
- Kingdom: Animalia
- Phylum: Arthropoda
- Clade: Pancrustacea
- Class: Insecta
- Order: Coleoptera
- Suborder: Polyphaga
- Infraorder: Scarabaeiformia
- Family: Scarabaeidae
- Genus: Aparammoecius
- Species: A. nomurai

Binomial name
- Aparammoecius nomurai (Stebnicka, 1986)

Synonyms
- Aphodius (Paremadus) nomurai Stebnicka, 1986; Caelius sulcatus Balthasar, 1952

Species of beetle

Aparammoecius nomurai is a species of beetle of the family Scarabaeidae. It is found in China (Fujian).

== Description ==
Adults reach a length of about 4–4.5 mm (0.16–0.18 in). They have a strongly convex body. The forebody is black, while the elytra are reddish-brown with preapical spots.
