= Gonaphodiellus sacatepequezis =

Scientific classification
- Kingdom: Animalia
- Phylum: Arthropoda
- Clade: Pancrustacea
- Class: Insecta
- Order: Coleoptera
- Suborder: Polyphaga
- Infraorder: Scarabaeiformia
- Family: Scarabaeidae
- Genus: Gonaphodiellus
- Species: G. sacatepequezis

Binomial name
- Gonaphodiellus sacatepequezis Dellacasa, Dellacasa & Gordon, 2012

Species of beetle

Gonaphodiellus sacatepequezis is a species of beetle of the family Scarabaeidae. It is found in Guatemala.

== Description ==
Adults reach a length of about 5–5.5 mm (0.20–0.22 in). They have an oblong, moderately convex, shiny, glabrous, piceous body. The margin of the clypeus, sides of the pronotum sides and part of the elytra are paler. The legs are dark brown and the club of the antennae is piceous.

== Etymology ==
The species is named after the type locality, Sacatepéquez (Guatemala).
