= Gonaphodiellus opisthius =

Scientific classification
- Kingdom: Animalia
- Phylum: Arthropoda
- Clade: Pancrustacea
- Class: Insecta
- Order: Coleoptera
- Suborder: Polyphaga
- Infraorder: Scarabaeiformia
- Family: Scarabaeidae
- Genus: Gonaphodiellus
- Species: G. opisthius

Binomial name
- Gonaphodiellus opisthius (Bates, 1887)

Synonyms
- Aphodius opisthius Bates, 1887; Aphodius duplex Bates, 1887

Species of beetle

Gonaphodiellus opisthius is a species of beetle of the family Scarabaeidae. It is found in Costa Rica, Guatemala, Honduras, Mexico (Aguascalientes, Chiapas, Chihuahua, Coahuila, Colima, Distrito Federal, Durango, Guanajuato, Guerrero, Hidalgo, Jalisco, México, Michoacán, Morelos, Nayarit, Nuevo León, Oaxaca, Puebla, Querétaro, Quintana Roo, Sinaloa, Sonora, Tabasco, Tlaxcala, Veracruz, Yucatán) and Nicaragua.

== Description ==
Adults reach a length of about 4–5 mm (0.16–0.20 in). They have an oval-elongate, moderately convex, sub-shiny, almost glabrous, yellowish-brown body. Part of the head and the disc of the pronotum are brownish and in most specimens, the elytra have brownish areas and an oval yellowish spot.

== Life history ==
Specimens have been collected in dung.
