= Gonaphodiellus arcanus =

Scientific classification
- Kingdom: Animalia
- Phylum: Arthropoda
- Clade: Pancrustacea
- Class: Insecta
- Order: Coleoptera
- Suborder: Polyphaga
- Infraorder: Scarabaeiformia
- Family: Scarabaeidae
- Genus: Gonaphodiellus
- Species: G. arcanus

Binomial name
- Gonaphodiellus arcanus Dellacasa, Dellacasa & Gordon, 2012

Species of beetle

Gonaphodiellus arcanus is a species of beetle of the family Scarabaeidae. It is found in Guatemala and Mexico (Chiapas).

== Description ==
Adults reach a length of about 3.5–4 mm (0.14–0.16 in). They have an oval, convex, shiny, glabrous, piceous body. The margin of the clypeus, anterior angles of the pronotum and the apex of the elytra are brownish-yellow, the latter with yellowish spots. The legs are pale brown and the club of the antennae is dirty testaceous.

== Etymology ==
The species name is derived from Latin arcanus (meaning hidden).
