= Gonaphodiellus omiltemicus =

Scientific classification
- Kingdom: Animalia
- Phylum: Arthropoda
- Clade: Pancrustacea
- Class: Insecta
- Order: Coleoptera
- Suborder: Polyphaga
- Infraorder: Scarabaeiformia
- Family: Scarabaeidae
- Genus: Gonaphodiellus
- Species: G. omiltemicus

Binomial name
- Gonaphodiellus omiltemicus Dellacasa, Dellacasa & Gordon, 2012

Species of beetle

Gonaphodiellus omiltemicus is a species of beetle of the family Scarabaeidae. It is found in Mexico (Guerrero).

== Description ==
Adults reach a length of about 5–5.5 mm (0.20–0.22 in). They have an oblong, moderately convex, sub-shiny, glabrous body. The head and pronotum are brownish, while the elytra are paler, in most specimens with the apical margin and a spot yellowish. The legs and club of the antennae are dark brown.

== Etymology ==
The species is named after the type locality, Omiltemi (Guerrero, Mexico).

== Life history ==
Specimens have been collected in horse dung.
