= Gonaphodiellus bimaculosus =

Scientific classification
- Kingdom: Animalia
- Phylum: Arthropoda
- Clade: Pancrustacea
- Class: Insecta
- Order: Coleoptera
- Suborder: Polyphaga
- Infraorder: Scarabaeiformia
- Family: Scarabaeidae
- Genus: Gonaphodiellus
- Species: G. bimaculosus

Binomial name
- Gonaphodiellus bimaculosus (Schmidt, 1909)

Synonyms
- Aphodius bimaculosus Schmidt, 1909; Aphodius (Gonaphodiellus) xalapensis Galante & Stebnicka & Verdu, 2003

Species of beetle

Gonaphodiellus bimaculosus is a species of beetle of the family Scarabaeidae. It is found in El Salvador and Mexico (Hidalgo, Jalisco, Michoacán, Oaxaca, Puebla, Querétaro, Veracruz).

== Description ==
Adults reach a length of about 5–6 mm (0.20–0.24 in). They have an oblong, moderately convex, shiny, glabrous, brown-yellowish body. The head, disc of the pronotum and elytra are brownish, the latter often with a yellowish spot and sometimes completely brownish. The legs are dark brown and the club of the antennae is brownish.

== Life history ==
Specimens have been collected in dung.
