= Gonaphodiellus =

Scientific classification
- Kingdom: Animalia
- Phylum: Arthropoda
- Clade: Pancrustacea
- Class: Insecta
- Order: Coleoptera
- Suborder: Polyphaga
- Infraorder: Scarabaeiformia
- Family: Scarabaeidae
- Subfamily: Aphodiinae
- Tribe: Aphodiini
- Genus: Gonaphodiellus; Schmidt, 1914

Synonyms
- Aphodius (Gonaphodiellus) Schmidt, 1914

Genus of beetles

Gonaphodiellus is a genus of beetles of the family Scarabaeidae.

== Species ==
- Gonaphodiellus arcanus Dellacasa, Dellacasa & Gordon, 2012
- Gonaphodiellus bimaculosus (Schmidt, 1909)
- Gonaphodiellus cerropuntanus Dellacasa, Dellacasa & Gordon, 2012
- Gonaphodiellus hoffmanni (Islas, 1945)
- Gonaphodiellus manantlanicus Dellacasa, Dellacasa & Gordon, 2012
- Gonaphodiellus martinpierai Dellacasa, Dellacasa & Gordon, 2012
- Gonaphodiellus nigrinus (Schmidt, 1917)
- Gonaphodiellus omiltemicus Dellacasa, Dellacasa & Gordon, 2012
- Gonaphodiellus opisthius (Bates, 1887)
- Gonaphodiellus pacatus (Harold, 1880)
- Gonaphodiellus sacatepequezis Dellacasa, Dellacasa & Gordon, 2012
- Gonaphodiellus sexguttatus (Schmidt, 1917)
