= Gonaphodiellus cerropuntanus =

Scientific classification
- Kingdom: Animalia
- Phylum: Arthropoda
- Clade: Pancrustacea
- Class: Insecta
- Order: Coleoptera
- Suborder: Polyphaga
- Infraorder: Scarabaeiformia
- Family: Scarabaeidae
- Genus: Gonaphodiellus
- Species: G. cerropuntanus

Binomial name
- Gonaphodiellus cerropuntanus Dellacasa, Dellacasa & Gordon, 2012

Species of beetle

Gonaphodiellus cerropuntanus is a species of beetle of the family Scarabaeidae. It is found in Costa Rica and Panama.

== Description ==
Adults reach a length of about 5.5–6 mm (0.22–0.24 in). They have an oblong, moderately convex, shiny, glabrous, brownish body. The margin of the clypeus, sides of the pronotum, as well as the base the of the elytra are yellowish, while the legs are brownish and the club of the antennae is dark testaceous.

== Etymology ==
The species is named after the type locality, Cerro Punta (Chiriquí, Panama).
