= Gonaphodiellus nigrinus =

Scientific classification
- Kingdom: Animalia
- Phylum: Arthropoda
- Clade: Pancrustacea
- Class: Insecta
- Order: Coleoptera
- Suborder: Polyphaga
- Infraorder: Scarabaeiformia
- Family: Scarabaeidae
- Genus: Gonaphodiellus
- Species: G. nigrinus

Binomial name
- Gonaphodiellus nigrinus (Schmidt, 1917)

Synonyms
- Aphodius (Gonaphodiellus) pacatus nigrinus Schmidt, 1917

Species of beetle

Gonaphodiellus nigrinus is a species of beetle of the family Scarabaeidae. It is found in Ecuador and Peru.

== Description ==
Adults reach a length of about 3.5–4 mm (0.14–0.16 in). They have an oval, convex, shiny, glabrous, dark brown body. The margin of the clypeus, base and sides of the pronotum and apex of the elytra are all yellowish-brown. The legs are brownish-yellow and the club of the antennae is brownish.
