= Gonaphodiellus martinpierai =

Scientific classification
- Kingdom: Animalia
- Phylum: Arthropoda
- Clade: Pancrustacea
- Class: Insecta
- Order: Coleoptera
- Suborder: Polyphaga
- Infraorder: Scarabaeiformia
- Family: Scarabaeidae
- Genus: Gonaphodiellus
- Species: G. martinpierai

Binomial name
- Gonaphodiellus martinpierai Dellacasa, Dellacasa & Gordon, 2012

Species of beetle

Gonaphodiellus martinpierai is a species of beetle of the family Scarabaeidae. It is found in Mexico (Veracruz).

== Description ==
Adults reach a length of about 5.5–6 mm (0.22–0.24 in). They have an oblong, convex, shiny, glabrous, dark brown body. The margin of the clypeus, anterior angles of the pronotum and base of the elytra are paler and the legs are brown-reddish. The club of the antennae is testaceous.

== Etymology ==
The species is named after Spanish Scarabaeoidea specialist Dr. Firmin Martín-Piera.

== Life history ==
Specimens have been collected in cow dung.
