= Gonaphodiellus sexguttatus =

Scientific classification
- Kingdom: Animalia
- Phylum: Arthropoda
- Clade: Pancrustacea
- Class: Insecta
- Order: Coleoptera
- Suborder: Polyphaga
- Infraorder: Scarabaeiformia
- Family: Scarabaeidae
- Genus: Gonaphodiellus
- Species: G. sexguttatus

Binomial name
- Gonaphodiellus sexguttatus (Schmidt, 1917)

Synonyms
- Aphodius (Gonaphodiellus) sexguttatus Schmidt, 1917

Species of beetle

Gonaphodiellus sexguttatus is a species of beetle of the family Scarabaeidae. It is found in Colombia, Costa Rica, El Salvador, Honduras, Mexico (Chiapas) and Panama.

== Description ==
Adults reach a length of about 4.5–5 mm (0.18–0.20 in). They have an elongate, moderately convex, sub-shiny, glabrous, dark brownish body. The margin of the clypeus and the fore angles of the pronotum are reddish and the elytra have yellowish spots, some with blackish margins. The legs are brownish-red and the club of the antennae is dark brown.
