= Gonaphodiellus pacatus =

Scientific classification
- Kingdom: Animalia
- Phylum: Arthropoda
- Clade: Pancrustacea
- Class: Insecta
- Order: Coleoptera
- Suborder: Polyphaga
- Infraorder: Scarabaeiformia
- Family: Scarabaeidae
- Genus: Gonaphodiellus
- Species: G. pacatus

Binomial name
- Gonaphodiellus pacatus (Harold, 1880)

Synonyms
- Aphodius pacatus Harold, 1880

Species of beetle

Gonaphodiellus pacatus is a species of beetle of the family Scarabaeidae. It is found in Bolivia, Colombia, Costa Rica and Panama.

== Description ==
Adults reach a length of about 5.5–6 mm (0.22–0.24 in). They have an oval-elongate, feebly convex, moderately shiny, glabrous, brown-yellowish body, with the disc of the pronotum and the disc of the elytra darker. The legs are brown-yellowish and the club of the antennae is pale testaceous.
