= Gonaphodiellus manantlanicus =

Scientific classification
- Kingdom: Animalia
- Phylum: Arthropoda
- Clade: Pancrustacea
- Class: Insecta
- Order: Coleoptera
- Suborder: Polyphaga
- Infraorder: Scarabaeiformia
- Family: Scarabaeidae
- Genus: Gonaphodiellus
- Species: G. manantlanicus

Binomial name
- Gonaphodiellus manantlanicus Dellacasa, Dellacasa & Gordon, 2012

Species of beetle

Gonaphodiellus manantlanicus is a species of beetle of the family Scarabaeidae. It is found in Mexico (Jalisco).

== Description ==
Adults reach a length of about 5–5.5 mm (0.20–0.22 in). They have an oblong, convex, mostly moderately shiny, glabrous, dark reddish-brown body. The margin of the clypeus, anterior angles of the pronotum and part of the elytra paler. The legs are brown-reddish and the club of the antennae is dark brownish.

== Etymology ==
The species is named after the type locality, Sierra de Manantlán (Jalisco, Mexico).

== Life history ==
Specimens have been collected in dung.
