= Gonaphodiellus hoffmanni =

Scientific classification
- Kingdom: Animalia
- Phylum: Arthropoda
- Clade: Pancrustacea
- Class: Insecta
- Order: Coleoptera
- Suborder: Polyphaga
- Infraorder: Scarabaeiformia
- Family: Scarabaeidae
- Genus: Gonaphodiellus
- Species: G. hoffmanni

Binomial name
- Gonaphodiellus hoffmanni (Islas, 1945)

Synonyms
- Aphodius (Gonaphodiellus) hoffmanni Islas, 1945

Species of beetle

Gonaphodiellus hoffmanni is a species of beetle of the family Scarabaeidae. It is found in Guatemala and Mexico (Chiapas, Oaxaca).

== Description ==
Adults reach a length of about 5.5–6 mm (0.22–0.24 in). They have an oblong, moderately convex, shiny, glabrous, dark brownish body, with the margin of the clypeus and the sides of the pronotum paler. The elytra have yellowish spots and the legs are brown-reddish. The club of the antennae is brownish.

== Life history ==
Specimens have been collected in horse dung.
