= Phalacronothus semiangulus =

Scientific classification
- Kingdom: Animalia
- Phylum: Arthropoda
- Clade: Pancrustacea
- Class: Insecta
- Order: Coleoptera
- Suborder: Polyphaga
- Infraorder: Scarabaeiformia
- Family: Scarabaeidae
- Genus: Phalacronothus
- Species: P. semiangulus

Binomial name
- Phalacronothus semiangulus (Balthasar, 1952)

Synonyms
- Aphodius (Phalacronothus) semiangulus Balthasar, 1952

Species of beetle

Phalacronothus semiangulus is a species of beetle of the family Scarabaeidae. It is found in China (Fujian).

== Description ==
Adults reach a length of about 4.8 mm (0.19 in). They have a quite strongly convex, shiny, glabrous body. The forebody is black, with the anterior margin of the head reddish. The elytra are blackish-brown, but lighter brown at the tips. The legs are brown.
