= Phalacronothus biguttatus =

Scientific classification
- Kingdom: Animalia
- Phylum: Arthropoda
- Clade: Pancrustacea
- Class: Insecta
- Order: Coleoptera
- Suborder: Polyphaga
- Infraorder: Scarabaeiformia
- Family: Scarabaeidae
- Genus: Phalacronothus
- Species: P. biguttatus

Binomial name
- Phalacronothus biguttatus (Germar, 1823)

Synonyms
- Aphodius biguttatus Germar, 1823; Aphodius (Phalacronothus) biguttatus pseudodiecki Dellacasa, 1983; Aphodius biguttatus petulans Schmidt, 1917; Eudolus discoloratus Schmidt, 1917; Aphodius (Orodalus) biguttatus conjunctulus Reitter, 1892; Aphodius sanguinolentus dubius Schilsky, 1889; Aphodius sanguinolentus apicalis Schilsky, 1888; Aphodius sanguinolentus fallax Schilsky, 1888; Aphodius sanguinolentus similis Schilsky, 1888; Aphodius lutigradus Gistel, 1857; Apohdius rusticus Gistel, 1857; Aphodius suturalis Erichson, 1848; Aphodius tyrolensis Rosenhauer, 1847; Scarabaeus sanguinolentus Panzer, 1797

Species of beetle

Phalacronothus biguttatus is a species of beetle of the family Scarabaeidae. It is found in Armenia, Austria, Belgium, Bosnia Herzegovina, Bulgaria, Croatia, France, Germany, Greece, Hungary, Iran, Italy, Kazakhstan, Latvia, Montenegro, Morocco, Poland, Romania, Russia (including Siberia), Serbia, Slovakia, Spain, Switzerland, Turkey, Turkmenistan and Ukraine.

== Description ==
Adults reach a length of about 2.5–3.5 mm (0.098–0.138 in). They have a rather short, convex, glossy, glabrous, black body, with the anterior angles of the pronotum reddish-brown. Each elytron has a reddish-brown preapical spot. The legs are brown.
