= Phalacronothus ceylonensis =

Scientific classification
- Kingdom: Animalia
- Phylum: Arthropoda
- Clade: Pancrustacea
- Class: Insecta
- Order: Coleoptera
- Suborder: Polyphaga
- Infraorder: Scarabaeiformia
- Family: Scarabaeidae
- Genus: Phalacronothus
- Species: P. ceylonensis

Binomial name
- Phalacronothus ceylonensis (Schmidt, 1912)

Synonyms
- Aphodius ceylonensis Schmidt, 1912

Species of beetle

Phalacronothus ceylonensis is a species of beetle of the family Scarabaeidae. It is found in Sri Lanka.

== Description ==
Adults reach a length of about 2.5–3 mm (0.098–0.118 in). They have a moderately convex, shiny, glabrous, dark chestnut-brown body. The anterior margin of the head, the sides of the pronotum, the scutellum, and the elytra are lighter brown. There is a small lighter-colored spot on each shoulder. The legs are brown.
