= Phalacronothus putoni =

Scientific classification
- Kingdom: Animalia
- Phylum: Arthropoda
- Clade: Pancrustacea
- Class: Insecta
- Order: Coleoptera
- Suborder: Polyphaga
- Infraorder: Scarabaeiformia
- Family: Scarabaeidae
- Genus: Phalacronothus
- Species: P. putoni

Binomial name
- Phalacronothus putoni (Reitter, 1894)

Synonyms
- Aphodius (Orodalus) putoni Reitter, 1894

Species of beetle

Phalacronothus putoni is a species of beetle of the family Scarabaeidae. It is found in Portugal and Spain.

== Description ==
Adults reach a length of about 3 mm (0.12 in). They have a quite parallel, elongate, nearly dull, glabrous, black body.
