= Phalacronothus =

Scientific classification
- Kingdom: Animalia
- Phylum: Arthropoda
- Clade: Pancrustacea
- Class: Insecta
- Order: Coleoptera
- Suborder: Polyphaga
- Infraorder: Scarabaeiformia
- Family: Scarabaeidae
- Subfamily: Aphodiinae
- Tribe: Aphodiini
- Genus: Phalacronothus; Motschulsky, 1859

Synonyms
- Aphodius (Paragolius) Balthasar, 1945; Aphodius (Caenaphodius) Balthasar, 1936; Aphodius (Emadus) Mulsant & Rey, 1870

Genus of beetles

Phalacronothus is a genus of beetles of the family Scarabaeidae.

== Species ==
- Phalacronothus ambulans (Petrovitz, 1971)
- Phalacronothus atlanticus (Balthasar, 1960)
- Phalacronothus biguttatus (Germar, 1823)
- Phalacronothus botulus (Balthasar, 1945)
- Phalacronothus ceylonensis (Schmidt, 1912)
- Phalacronothus citellorum (Semenov & Medvedev, 1929)
- Phalacronothus flavolimbatus (Petrovitz, 1963)
- Phalacronothus fumigatulus (Reitter, 1892)
- Phalacronothus hilaris (Harold, 1869)
- Phalacronothus putoni (Reitter, 1894)
- Phalacronothus quadrimaculatus (Linnaeus, 1761)
- Phalacronothus semiangulus (Balthasar, 1952)
- Phalacronothus suturinigra (Schmidt, 1917)
