= Phalacronothus citellorum =

Scientific classification
- Kingdom: Animalia
- Phylum: Arthropoda
- Clade: Pancrustacea
- Class: Insecta
- Order: Coleoptera
- Suborder: Polyphaga
- Infraorder: Scarabaeiformia
- Family: Scarabaeidae
- Genus: Phalacronothus
- Species: P. citellorum

Binomial name
- Phalacronothus citellorum (Semenov & Medvedev, 1929)

Synonyms
- Aphodius (Emadus) citellorum Semenov & Medvedev, 1929; Aphodius (Emadus) quadrimaculatus supermaculatus Mader, 1953

Species of beetle

Phalacronothus citellorum is a species of beetle of the family Scarabaeidae. It is found in Austria, Bulgaria, the Czech Republic, Hungary, Kazakhstan, Romania, Russia, Turkey and Ukraine.

== Description ==
Adults reach a length of about 3.2–4.2 mm (0.13–0.17 in). They have an elongate, nearly parallel-sided, smooth, shining, black body. The anterior angles of the pronotum are reddish and the elytra have red shoulders, a basal spot and a preapical spot. The legs are brownish-red.
