= Phalacronothus quadrimaculatus =

Scientific classification
- Kingdom: Animalia
- Phylum: Arthropoda
- Clade: Pancrustacea
- Class: Insecta
- Order: Coleoptera
- Suborder: Polyphaga
- Infraorder: Scarabaeiformia
- Family: Scarabaeidae
- Genus: Phalacronothus
- Species: P. quadrimaculatus

Binomial name
- Phalacronothus quadrimaculatus (Linnaeus, 1761)

Synonyms
- Scarabaeus quadrimaculatus Linnaeus, 1761; Phalacronothus quadrimaculatus nigrolucens Dellacasa & Dellacasa, 2005; Aphodius (Phalacronothus) quadrimaculatus pseudopetulans Dellacasa, 1983; Aphodius (Emadus) quadrimaculatus hexaguttatus Baraud, 1977; Aphodius (Phalacronothus) quadrisignatus confluens Petrovitz, 1963; Aphodius (Phalacronothus) quadrisignatus continuus Petrovitz, 1963; Aphodius (Phalacronothus) quadrisignatus deceptus Petrovitz, 1963; Aphodius (Calamosternus) quadrimaculatus biguttulus Fiori, 1907; Aphodius lunulatus Orbigny, 1896; Aphodius diecki Harold, 1870; Aphodius hexaguttatus Auber; Aphodius quadrimaculatus caudatus Mulsant, 1842; Aphodius quadrimaculatus prolongatus Mulsant, 1842; Aphodius quadrimaculatus sanguinolens Mulsant, 1842; Aphodius sexpustulatus Gebler, 1841; Aphodius macri Costa, 1839; Aphodius quadrisignatus Brullé, 1832; Scarabaeus quadripustulatus Fabricius, 1792

Species of beetle

Phalacronothus quadrimaculatus is a species of beetle of the family Scarabaeidae. It is found in Albania, Algeria, Armenia, Austria, Belarus, Belgium, Bosnia and Herzegovina, Croatia, the Czech Republic, Finland, France, Germany, Great Britain, Greece, Hungary, Italy (Sicily), Kazakhstan, Latvia, Lebanon, Montenegro, Morocco, the Netherlands, Poland, Portugal, Romania, Russia, Siberia, Slovakia, Slovenia, Spain, Sweden, Switzerland, Syria, Tunisia, Turkey and Ukraine.

== Description ==
Adults reach a length of about 3–4 mm (0.12–0.16 in). They have an oval-elongate, moderately convex, shiny or sericeous, glabrous, blackish body. The elytra have red spots, and are sometimes brown-reddish, reddish or blackish.
