= Phalacronothus fumigatulus =

Scientific classification
- Kingdom: Animalia
- Phylum: Arthropoda
- Clade: Pancrustacea
- Class: Insecta
- Order: Coleoptera
- Suborder: Polyphaga
- Infraorder: Scarabaeiformia
- Family: Scarabaeidae
- Genus: Phalacronothus
- Species: P. fumigatulus

Binomial name
- Phalacronothus fumigatulus (Reitter, 1892)

Synonyms
- Aphodius (Esimus) fumigatulus Reitter, 1892; Aphodius (Caenaphodius) asperolineatus Balthasar, 1936; Aphodius (Esimus) sculpturatus Reitter, 1892

Species of beetle

Phalacronothus fumigatulus is a species of beetle of the family Scarabaeidae. It is found in Armenia, Bulgaria, Georgia, Greece, Iran, Israel, Lebanon, Macedonia, Syria, Turkey and Turkmenistan.

== Description ==
Adults reach a length of about 3.5–4 mm (0.14–0.16 in). They have a shiny, glabrous, black body, with the elytra pale yellow with a black sutural interval and a reddish apical spot. The legs are dark brown.
