= Phalacronothus suturinigra =

Scientific classification
- Kingdom: Animalia
- Phylum: Arthropoda
- Clade: Pancrustacea
- Class: Insecta
- Order: Coleoptera
- Suborder: Polyphaga
- Infraorder: Scarabaeiformia
- Family: Scarabaeidae
- Genus: Phalacronothus
- Species: P. suturinigra

Binomial name
- Phalacronothus suturinigra (Schmidt, 1917)

Synonyms
- Aphodius suturinigra Schmidt, 1917; Aphodius (Esimus) albidipennis Reitter, 1892; Aphodius suturalis Redtenbacher, 1843

Species of beetle

Phalacronothus suturinigra is a species of beetle of the family Scarabaeidae. It is found in Armenia, Iran, Iraq, Israel, Romania, Lebanon, Syria and Turkey.

== Description ==
Adults reach a length of about 3.5–4.5 mm (0.14–0.18 in). They have an elongate-oval, moderately convex, glabrous, black body, with the anterior angles of the pronotum yellowish-red. The elytra are whitish-yellow to brownish-yellow, with the sutural interval and sometimes also the outermost lateral margin blackened. The legs are dark rust-red.
