= Phalacronothus hilaris =

Scientific classification
- Kingdom: Animalia
- Phylum: Arthropoda
- Clade: Pancrustacea
- Class: Insecta
- Order: Coleoptera
- Suborder: Polyphaga
- Infraorder: Scarabaeiformia
- Family: Scarabaeidae
- Genus: Phalacronothus
- Species: P. hilaris

Binomial name
- Phalacronothus hilaris (Harold, 1869)

Synonyms
- Aphodius hilaris Harold, 1869

Species of beetle

Phalacronothus hilaris is a species of beetle of the family Scarabaeidae. It is found in Armenia, Iran and Palestine.

== Description ==
Adults reach a length of about 4.5–5 mm (0.18–0.20 in). They have an elongate, moderately convex, highly glossy, glabrous, black body, with the anterior part of the head and the sides of the pronotum lighter. There are three spots (including one elongated spot) on the elytra and the legs are brown.
