= Phalacronothus botulus =

Scientific classification
- Kingdom: Animalia
- Phylum: Arthropoda
- Clade: Pancrustacea
- Class: Insecta
- Order: Coleoptera
- Suborder: Polyphaga
- Infraorder: Scarabaeiformia
- Family: Scarabaeidae
- Genus: Phalacronothus
- Species: P. botulus

Binomial name
- Phalacronothus botulus (Balthasar, 1945)

Synonyms
- Aphodius (Paragolius) botulus Balthasar, 1945; Aphodius (Amidorus) manschuriensis Petrovitz, 1958; Aphodius (Orodalus) naraensis Nakane, 1956

Species of beetle

Phalacronothus botulus is a species of beetle of the family Scarabaeidae. It is found in China (Heilongjiang, Jilin), Japan, Korea and the Russian Far East.

== Description ==
Adults reach a length of about 3–3.3 mm (0.12–0.13 in). They have a shiny, black body, with the humeral area and part of the apical area of the elytra yellowish-brown.
