= Brachiaphodius pilosus =

Scientific classification
- Kingdom: Animalia
- Phylum: Arthropoda
- Clade: Pancrustacea
- Class: Insecta
- Order: Coleoptera
- Suborder: Polyphaga
- Infraorder: Scarabaeiformia
- Family: Scarabaeidae
- Genus: Brachiaphodius
- Species: B. pilosus

Binomial name
- Brachiaphodius pilosus (Harold, 1874)

Synonyms
- Aphodius pilosus Harold, 1874; Aphodius (Balthasarianus) abditus Petrovitz, 1970; Aphodius (Trichaphodius) gregori Balthasar, 1941

Species of beetle

Brachiaphodius pilosus is a species of beetle of the family Scarabaeidae. It is found in Bhutan, India (Sikkim, Uttarakhand, West Bengal), Japan, Nepal and Taiwan.

== Description ==
Adults reach a length of about 6–7.5 mm (0.24–0.30 in). They have an elongate-oval, moderately convex, shiny, quite finely pubescent, dark brown body, sometimes with the margin of the clypeus and elytra paler.
