= Brachiaphodius jendeki =

Scientific classification
- Kingdom: Animalia
- Phylum: Arthropoda
- Clade: Pancrustacea
- Class: Insecta
- Order: Coleoptera
- Suborder: Polyphaga
- Infraorder: Scarabaeiformia
- Family: Scarabaeidae
- Genus: Brachiaphodius
- Species: B. jendeki

Binomial name
- Brachiaphodius jendeki (Král, 2000)

Synonyms
- Aphodius (Brachiaphodius) jendeki Král, 2000

Species of beetle

Brachiaphodius jendeki is a species of beetle of the family Scarabaeidae. It is found in China (Yunnan) and Myanmar.

== Description ==
Adults reach a length of about 6.9–7.6 mm (0.27–0.30 in). They have an oblong, moderately convex, moderately shining body, with pale, yellowish-brown setae. They are brown to piceous, with the antennae, mouthparts and legs and sometimes also the pronotum lighter.

== Life history ==
Specimens have been collected from horse dung.

== Etymology ==
The species is named in honour of Eduard Jendek.
