= Brachiaphodius nainiensis =

Scientific classification
- Kingdom: Animalia
- Phylum: Arthropoda
- Clade: Pancrustacea
- Class: Insecta
- Order: Coleoptera
- Suborder: Polyphaga
- Infraorder: Scarabaeiformia
- Family: Scarabaeidae
- Genus: Brachiaphodius
- Species: B. nainiensis

Binomial name
- Brachiaphodius nainiensis (Petrovitz, 1963)

Synonyms
- Aphodius (Balthasarianus) nainiensis Petrovitz, 1963

Species of beetle

Brachiaphodius nainiensis is a species of beetle of the family Scarabaeidae. It is found in India (Meghalaya, Uttar Pradesh) and Nepal.

== Description ==
Adults reach a length of about 6–6.5 mm (0.24–0.26 in). They have a dark castaneous, rather thickset, moderately convex body.
