= Brachiaphodius yaaunitnoi =

Scientific classification
- Kingdom: Animalia
- Phylum: Arthropoda
- Clade: Pancrustacea
- Class: Insecta
- Order: Coleoptera
- Suborder: Polyphaga
- Infraorder: Scarabaeiformia
- Family: Scarabaeidae
- Genus: Brachiaphodius
- Species: B. yaaunitnoi

Binomial name
- Brachiaphodius yaaunitnoi (Masumoto, 1991)

Synonyms
- Aphodius (Balthasarianus) yaaunitnoi Masumoto, 1991

Species of beetle

Brachiaphodius yaaunitnoi is a species of beetle of the family Scarabaeidae. It is found in Thailand.

== Description ==
Adults reach a length of about 7.3–7.6 mm (0.29–0.30 in).
