= Brachiaphodius taiwanicus =

Scientific classification
- Kingdom: Animalia
- Phylum: Arthropoda
- Clade: Pancrustacea
- Class: Insecta
- Order: Coleoptera
- Suborder: Polyphaga
- Infraorder: Scarabaeiformia
- Family: Scarabaeidae
- Genus: Brachiaphodius
- Species: B. taiwanicus

Binomial name
- Brachiaphodius taiwanicus (Petrovitz, 1976)

Synonyms
- Aphodius (Balthasarianus) taiwanicus Petrovitz, 1976

Species of beetle

Brachiaphodius taiwanicus is a species of beetle of the family Scarabaeidae. It is found in Taiwan.

== Description ==
Adults reach a length of about 6.2–7.2 mm (0.24–0.28 in).
