= Brachiaphodius =

Scientific classification
- Kingdom: Animalia
- Phylum: Arthropoda
- Clade: Pancrustacea
- Class: Insecta
- Order: Coleoptera
- Suborder: Polyphaga
- Infraorder: Scarabaeiformia
- Family: Scarabaeidae
- Subfamily: Aphodiinae
- Tribe: Aphodiini
- Genus: Brachiaphodius; Koshantschikov, 1913

Synonyms
- Aphodius (Balthasarianus) Paulian, 1934

Genus of beetles

Brachiaphodius is a genus of beetles of the family Scarabaeidae.

== Species ==
- Brachiaphodius ahrensi (Král, 2000)
- Brachiaphodius babori (Balthasar, 1938)
- Brachiaphodius bellmanni Bordat, 2005
- Brachiaphodius eccoptus (Bates, 1889)
- Brachiaphodius harpalinus (Gerstaecker, 1884)
- Brachiaphodius jeanneli (Paulian, 1938)
- Brachiaphodius jendeki (Král, 2000)
- Brachiaphodius langeri (Bellmann, 2009)
- Brachiaphodius nainiensis (Petrovitz, 1963)
- Brachiaphodius pilifer (Paulian, 1934)
- Brachiaphodius pilosus (Harold, 1874)
- Brachiaphodius ruupbai (Masumoto, 1991)
- Brachiaphodius taiwanicus (Petrovitz, 1976)
- Brachiaphodius weibao (Král, 2000)
- Brachiaphodius yaaunitnoi (Masumoto, 1991)
- Brachiaphodius yuan (Král, 2000)
