= Brachiaphodius babori =

Scientific classification
- Kingdom: Animalia
- Phylum: Arthropoda
- Clade: Pancrustacea
- Class: Insecta
- Order: Coleoptera
- Suborder: Polyphaga
- Infraorder: Scarabaeiformia
- Family: Scarabaeidae
- Genus: Brachiaphodius
- Species: B. babori

Binomial name
- Brachiaphodius babori (Balthasar, 1938)

Synonyms
- Aphodius (Balthasarianus) babori Balthasar, 1938

Species of beetle

Brachiaphodius babori is a species of beetle of the family Scarabaeidae. It is found in China (Sichuan).

== Description ==
Adults reach a length of about 7.4–7.8 mm (0.29–0.31 in). They are dark brown to blackish-brown and the dorsal surface is covered with yellowish hairs.
