= Brachiaphodius pilifer =

Scientific classification
- Kingdom: Animalia
- Phylum: Arthropoda
- Clade: Pancrustacea
- Class: Insecta
- Order: Coleoptera
- Suborder: Polyphaga
- Infraorder: Scarabaeiformia
- Family: Scarabaeidae
- Genus: Brachiaphodius
- Species: B. pilifer

Binomial name
- Brachiaphodius pilifer (Paulian, 1934)

Synonyms
- Aphodius (Balthasarianus) pilifer Paulian, 1934; Aphodius (Balthasarianus) fruhstorferi Petrovitz, 1970

Species of beetle

Brachiaphodius pilifer is a species of beetle of the family Scarabaeidae. It is found in Nepal, Taiwan, India (West Bengal), Laos, Myanmar, Thailand and Vietnam.

== Description ==
Adults reach a length of about 6.7–7.5 mm (0.26–0.30 in). They are black or dark brown and glossy. The entire dorsal surface is covered with fairly long, light-colored hairs.
