= Brachiaphodius yuan =

Scientific classification
- Kingdom: Animalia
- Phylum: Arthropoda
- Clade: Pancrustacea
- Class: Insecta
- Order: Coleoptera
- Suborder: Polyphaga
- Infraorder: Scarabaeiformia
- Family: Scarabaeidae
- Genus: Brachiaphodius
- Species: B. yuan

Binomial name
- Brachiaphodius yuan (Král, 2000)

Synonyms
- Aphodius (Brachiaphodius) yuan Král, 2000

Species of beetle

Brachiaphodius yuan is a species of beetle of the family Scarabaeidae. It is found in China (Yunnan) and Vietnam.

== Description ==
Adults reach a length of about 7–7.5 mm (0.28–0.30 in). They have an oblong, moderately convex, strongly shining body, with pale, yellowish-brown setae. They are brown to piceous, with the antennae, mouthparts and legs lighter.

== Etymology ==
The species name is derived from Yuan Jiang (the Chinese name for the Red River), which runs through its distribution area.
