= Brachiaphodius ahrensi =

Scientific classification
- Kingdom: Animalia
- Phylum: Arthropoda
- Clade: Pancrustacea
- Class: Insecta
- Order: Coleoptera
- Suborder: Polyphaga
- Infraorder: Scarabaeiformia
- Family: Scarabaeidae
- Genus: Brachiaphodius
- Species: B. ahrensi

Binomial name
- Brachiaphodius ahrensi (Král, 2000)

Synonyms
- Aphodius (Brachiaphodius) ahrensi Král, 2000

Species of beetle

Brachiaphodius ahrensi is a species of beetle of the family Scarabaeidae. It is found in Nepal.

== Description ==
Adults reach a length of about 6.7 mm (0.26 in). They have an oblong, moderately convex, brown to piceous body, with the antennae, mouthparts and legs lighter. The dorsal surface is mostly shining. They have pale, yellowish brown setae.

== Etymology ==
The species is named in honour of Dirk Ahrens.
