= Brachiaphodius weibao =

Scientific classification
- Kingdom: Animalia
- Phylum: Arthropoda
- Clade: Pancrustacea
- Class: Insecta
- Order: Coleoptera
- Suborder: Polyphaga
- Infraorder: Scarabaeiformia
- Family: Scarabaeidae
- Genus: Brachiaphodius
- Species: B. weibao

Binomial name
- Brachiaphodius weibao (Král, 2000)

Synonyms
- Aphodius (Brachiaphodius) weibao Král, 2000

Species of beetle

Brachiaphodius weibao is a species of beetle of the family Scarabaeidae. It is found in China (Yunnan).

== Description ==
Adults reach a length of about 6.5–7.3 mm (0.26–0.29 in). They have an oblong, moderately convex, strongly shining body, with pale, yellowish-brown setae. They are brown to piceous, with the antennae, mouthparts and legs lighter.

== Life history ==
Specimens have been collected from horse dung.

== Etymology ==
The species is named after its type locality, the Weibaoshan mountains.
