= Brachiaphodius eccoptus =

Scientific classification
- Kingdom: Animalia
- Phylum: Arthropoda
- Clade: Pancrustacea
- Class: Insecta
- Order: Coleoptera
- Suborder: Polyphaga
- Infraorder: Scarabaeiformia
- Family: Scarabaeidae
- Genus: Brachiaphodius
- Species: B. eccoptus

Binomial name
- Brachiaphodius eccoptus (Bates, 1889)

Synonyms
- Aphodius eccoptus Bates, 1889; Aphodius (Acrossus) koichianus Matsumura, 1934

Species of beetle

Brachiaphodius eccoptus is a species of beetle of the family Scarabaeidae. It is found in Japan.

== Description ==
Adults reach a length of about 8.6–9.3 mm (0.34–0.37 in).
