= Brachiaphodius ruupbai =

Scientific classification
- Kingdom: Animalia
- Phylum: Arthropoda
- Clade: Pancrustacea
- Class: Insecta
- Order: Coleoptera
- Suborder: Polyphaga
- Infraorder: Scarabaeiformia
- Family: Scarabaeidae
- Genus: Brachiaphodius
- Species: B. ruupbai

Binomial name
- Brachiaphodius ruupbai (Masumoto, 1991)

Synonyms
- Aphodius (Balthasarianus) ruupbai Masumoto, 1991

Species of beetle

Brachiaphodius ruupbai is a species of beetle of the family Scarabaeidae. It is found in Thailand and China (Yunnan).

== Description ==
Adults reach a length of about 6–6.2 mm (0.24–0.24 in).
