= Mendidaphodius angustatus =

Scientific classification
- Kingdom: Animalia
- Phylum: Arthropoda
- Clade: Pancrustacea
- Class: Insecta
- Order: Coleoptera
- Suborder: Polyphaga
- Infraorder: Scarabaeiformia
- Family: Scarabaeidae
- Genus: Mendidaphodius
- Species: M. angustatus

Binomial name
- Mendidaphodius angustatus (Klug, 1830)

Synonyms
- Aphodius angustatus Klug, 1830

Species of beetle

Mendidaphodius angustatus is a species of beetle of the family Scarabaeidae. It is found in Egypt, Angola, Kenya and Sudan.

== Description ==
Adults reach a length of about 3.5–4 mm (0.14–0.16 in). They are very similar to Mendidaphodius linearis in both shape and colour.
