= Mendidaphodius paganettii =

Scientific classification
- Kingdom: Animalia
- Phylum: Arthropoda
- Clade: Pancrustacea
- Class: Insecta
- Order: Coleoptera
- Suborder: Polyphaga
- Infraorder: Scarabaeiformia
- Family: Scarabaeidae
- Genus: Mendidaphodius
- Species: M. paganettii

Binomial name
- Mendidaphodius paganettii (Petrovitz, 1963)

Synonyms
- Aphodius (Nialus) paganettii Petrovitz, 1963; Aphodius (Nialus) linearis lajonquieri Baraud, 1977; Aphodius cylindricus Dejean, 1833 (nomen nudum)

Species of beetle

Mendidaphodius paganettii is a species of beetle of the family Scarabaeidae. It is found in Morocco, Portugal and Spain.

== Description ==
Adults reach a length of about 5–5.5 mm (0.20–0.22 in). They have a cylindrically elongate, convex, shiny, glabrous, blackish body. The margin of the clypeus and front angles of the pronotum are reddish. The legs are brown-reddish and the antennal club is brownish.
