= Mendidaphodius pseudoadustus =

Scientific classification
- Kingdom: Animalia
- Phylum: Arthropoda
- Clade: Pancrustacea
- Class: Insecta
- Order: Coleoptera
- Suborder: Polyphaga
- Infraorder: Scarabaeiformia
- Family: Scarabaeidae
- Genus: Mendidaphodius
- Species: M. pseudoadustus

Binomial name
- Mendidaphodius pseudoadustus (Petrovitz, 1958)

Synonyms
- Aphodius (Mendidaphodius) pseudoadustus Petrovitz, 1958

Species of beetle

Mendidaphodius pseudoadustus is a species of beetle of the family Scarabaeidae. It is found in India (Rajasthan).

== Description ==
Adults reach a length of about 3.5–3.8 mm (0.14–0.15 in). They have a nearly parallel-sided, highly lustrous, reddish-brown body, with the sides of the head and pronotum, the legs, and the elytra somewhat lighter. The antennae are yellow.
