= Mendidaphodius =

Scientific classification
- Kingdom: Animalia
- Phylum: Arthropoda
- Clade: Pancrustacea
- Class: Insecta
- Order: Coleoptera
- Suborder: Polyphaga
- Infraorder: Scarabaeiformia
- Family: Scarabaeidae
- Subfamily: Aphodiinae
- Tribe: Aphodiini
- Genus: Mendidaphodius; Reitter, 1901

Synonyms
- Aphodius (Mendidaphodius) Reitter, 1901

Genus of beetles

Mendidaphodius is a genus of beetles of the family Scarabaeidae.

== Species ==
- Mendidaphodius adustus (Klug, 1855)
- Mendidaphodius angustatus (Klug, 1830)
- Mendidaphodius armatulus (Fairmaire, 1893)
- Mendidaphodius armiger (Harold, 1871)
- Mendidaphodius biangulatus (Fairmaire, 1893)
- Mendidaphodius brancsiki (Reitter, 1899)
- Mendidaphodius calamitosus (Balthasar, 1935)
- Mendidaphodius ellenbergeri Paulian, 1942
- Mendidaphodius fischeri (Petrovitz, 1962)
- Mendidaphodius ganabi (Endrödi, 1977)
- Mendidaphodius leleupi (Endrödi, 1960)
- Mendidaphodius lepidulus (Harold, 1866)
- Mendidaphodius linearis (Reiche & Saulcy, 1856)
- Mendidaphodius minusculus (Fairmaire, 1893)
- Mendidaphodius nodulifer (Koshantschikov, 1894)
- Mendidaphodius paganettii (Petrovitz, 1963)
- Mendidaphodius palaestinensis (Petrovitz, 1963)
- Mendidaphodius porrectus (Schmidt, 1914)
- Mendidaphodius pseudoadustus (Petrovitz, 1958)
- Mendidaphodius ruandanus Endrödi, 1955
- Mendidaphodius rufovittatus (Müller, 1941)
- Mendidaphodius rugulicollis (Fairmaire, 1893)
- Mendidaphodius rutilior (Endrödi, 1960)
- Mendidaphodius rutilus (Klug, 1830)
- Mendidaphodius steinbergi (Nikritin, 1973)
- Mendidaphodius timurkirgizi Dellacasa & Dellacasa, 2009
- Mendidaphodius uaniombae Paulian, 1942
- Mendidaphodius weidholzi (Petrovitz, 1964)
