= Mendidaphodius nodulifer =

Scientific classification
- Kingdom: Animalia
- Phylum: Arthropoda
- Clade: Pancrustacea
- Class: Insecta
- Order: Coleoptera
- Suborder: Polyphaga
- Infraorder: Scarabaeiformia
- Family: Scarabaeidae
- Genus: Mendidaphodius
- Species: M. nodulifer

Binomial name
- Mendidaphodius nodulifer (Koshantschikov, 1894)

Synonyms
- Aphodius (Meraphodius) nodulifer Koshantschikov, 1894

Species of beetle

Mendidaphodius nodulifer is a species of beetle of the family Scarabaeidae. It is found in Uzbekistan.

== Description ==
Adults reach a length of about 5–6 mm (0.20–0.24 in). They have a shiny, slightly convex, black body, with the margins of the head, the sides of the pronotum and the elytra dark reddish-brown, the latter becoming somewhat lighter toward the apex. The legs are lighter brown.
