= Mendidaphodius rutilus =

Scientific classification
- Kingdom: Animalia
- Phylum: Arthropoda
- Clade: Pancrustacea
- Class: Insecta
- Order: Coleoptera
- Suborder: Polyphaga
- Infraorder: Scarabaeiformia
- Family: Scarabaeidae
- Genus: Mendidaphodius
- Species: M. rutilus

Binomial name
- Mendidaphodius rutilus (Klug, 1830)

Synonyms
- Aphodius rutilus Klug, 1830; Aphodius (Mendidaphodius) rutilus subniger Endrödi, 1960; Aphodius lesnei Schmidt, 1911

Species of beetle

Mendidaphodius rutilus is a species of beetle of the family Scarabaeidae. It is found in Egypt, Saudi Arabia, Yemen, Botswana, Chad, Ethiopia, Kenya, Namibia, the Democratic Republic of the Congo, South Africa (Cape), Senegal, Somalia, Sudan and Tanzania.

== Description ==
Adults reach a length of about 3–3.5 mm (0.12–0.14 in). They have a moderately convex, shiny body. The head and pronotum are reddish-brown to blackish-brown with lighter lateral margins. The elytra are reddish with a dark spot and darkened sides.
