= Mendidaphodius brancsiki =

Scientific classification
- Kingdom: Animalia
- Phylum: Arthropoda
- Clade: Pancrustacea
- Class: Insecta
- Order: Coleoptera
- Suborder: Polyphaga
- Infraorder: Scarabaeiformia
- Family: Scarabaeidae
- Genus: Mendidaphodius
- Species: M. brancsiki

Binomial name
- Mendidaphodius brancsiki (Reitter, 1899)

Synonyms
- Mendidius brancsiki Reitter, 1899; Aphodius (Mendidius) adolfischmidti Reitter, 1909; Aphodius (Mendidaphodius) spinifrontis Reitter, 1901

Species of beetle

Mendidaphodius brancsiki is a species of beetle of the family Scarabaeidae. It is found in Afghanistan, Azerbaijan, Iran, Kazakhstan, Russia and Turkmenistan.

== Description ==
Adults reach a length of about 4–5.5 mm (0.16–0.22 in). They have a cylindrical, elongate, convex, shiny, glabrous body. The head and pronotum are brownish, while the elytra are dirty yellowish with the suture and lateral margins piceous. The legs are reddish and the antennal club is brownish.
