= Mendidaphodius fischeri =

Scientific classification
- Kingdom: Animalia
- Phylum: Arthropoda
- Clade: Pancrustacea
- Class: Insecta
- Order: Coleoptera
- Suborder: Polyphaga
- Infraorder: Scarabaeiformia
- Family: Scarabaeidae
- Genus: Mendidaphodius
- Species: M. fischeri

Binomial name
- Mendidaphodius fischeri (Petrovitz, 1962)

Synonyms
- Aphodius (Mendidaphodius) fischeri Petrovitz, 1962

Species of beetle

Mendidaphodius fischeri is a species of beetle of the family Scarabaeidae. It is found in Turkmenistan.

== Description ==
Adults reach a length of about 4.7 mm (0.19 in). They have a broad, somewhat convex, shiny body. The head, pronotum (except for the yellowish-red lateral margins), scutellum and the elytral suture are blackish-brown. The elytra are brownish-yellow, and the legs are yellow-brown. The lateral margins of the pronotum have long, yellow cilia and the elytra have dense hairs along the sides and in the apical region.
