= Mendidaphodius lepidulus =

Scientific classification
- Kingdom: Animalia
- Phylum: Arthropoda
- Clade: Pancrustacea
- Class: Insecta
- Order: Coleoptera
- Suborder: Polyphaga
- Infraorder: Scarabaeiformia
- Family: Scarabaeidae
- Genus: Mendidaphodius
- Species: M. lepidulus

Binomial name
- Mendidaphodius lepidulus (Harold, 1866)

Synonyms
- Aphodius lepidulus Harold, 1866; Aphodius (Mendidius) bagdadensis Petrovitz, 1971; Aphodius fuscolimbatus Harold, 1880

Species of beetle

Mendidaphodius lepidulus is a species of beetle of the family Scarabaeidae. It is found in Afghanistan, Iran, Iraq, Israel and Syria.

== Description ==
Adults reach a length of about 4–6 mm (0.16–0.24 in). They have a subcylindrical, elongate, moderately convex, shiny, glabrous body. The head and pronotum are brown-reddish, the latter with the front angles testaceous. The elytra are yellowish with the lateral margins dark reddish. The legs are brown-yellow and the antennal club is brownish.
