= Mendidaphodius linearis =

Scientific classification
- Kingdom: Animalia
- Phylum: Arthropoda
- Clade: Pancrustacea
- Class: Insecta
- Order: Coleoptera
- Suborder: Polyphaga
- Infraorder: Scarabaeiformia
- Family: Scarabaeidae
- Genus: Mendidaphodius
- Species: M. linearis

Binomial name
- Mendidaphodius linearis (Reiche & Saulcy, 1856)

Synonyms
- Aphodius linearis Reiche & Saulcy, 1856; Aphodius (Nialus) sareptanus Balthasar, 1935; Aphodius (Nialus) sareptanus ab. rubronotatus Balthasar, 1935; Aphodius (Nialus) malinovskyi Koshantschikov, 1913; Aphodius (Nialus) malinovskyi var. roseus Koshantschikov, 1913; Aphodius lgockii breitianus Roubal, 1913; Aphodius varians var. lgockii Roubal, 1912; Aphodius plagiatus ab. elegantulus Hochhuth, 1873; Aphodius cylindricus Reiche & Saulcy, 1856

Species of beetle

Mendidaphodius linearis is a species of beetle of the family Scarabaeidae. It is found in Belarus, Egypt, Iran, Israel, Kazakhstan, Russia, Turkey, Ukraine and possibly Cyprus.

== Description ==
Adults reach a length of about 4–5 mm (0.16–0.20 in). They have a cylindrical, elongate, convex, shiny, glabrous, piceous body. The margin of the clypeus and front angles of the pronotum are reddish. The elytra are sometimes dark reddish or piceous with an orange discal spot. The legs are brown-reddish and the antennal club is brownish.
