= Paradidactylia =

Scientific classification
- Kingdom: Animalia
- Phylum: Arthropoda
- Clade: Pancrustacea
- Class: Insecta
- Order: Coleoptera
- Suborder: Polyphaga
- Infraorder: Scarabaeiformia
- Family: Scarabaeidae
- Tribe: Aphodiini
- Subtribe: Aphodiina
- Genus: Paradidactylia; Balthasar, 1937

Genus of beetles

Paradidactylia is a genus of beetles of the family Scarabaeidae.

== Species ==
- Paradidactylia avuncula (Balthasar, 1946)
- Paradidactylia avus (Petrovitz, 1966)
- Paradidactylia biseriata (Schmidt, 1908)
- Paradidactylia brivioi (Petrovitz, 1961)
- Paradidactylia carinulata (Motschulsky, 1863)
- Paradidactylia continua (Petrovitz, 1972)
- Paradidactylia dionysii Clément, 1958
- Paradidactylia fastigata (Schmidt, 1908)
- Paradidactylia flavescens Balthasar, 1961
- Paradidactylia haafi (Petrovitz, 1961)
- Paradidactylia hiekei (Endrödi, 1983)
- Paradidactylia incomparabilis Bordat, 2005
- Paradidactylia jattaensis (Petrovitz, 1969)
- Paradidactylia kathmandui (Stebnicka, 1985)
- Paradidactylia klasinskii Minkina, 2016
- Paradidactylia madibirana (Petrovitz, 1964)
- Paradidactylia montana Clément, 1958
- Paradidactylia ovatula (Harold, 1861)
- Paradidactylia shantungensis (Balthasar, 1941)
- Paradidactylia umfolozica (Endrödi, 1976)
- Paradidactylia variolosa Clément, 1958
- Paradidactylia venalis (Schmidt, 1910)
- Paradidactylia venaloides (Endrödi, 1960)
- Paradidactylia wichei (Petrovitz, 1961)
