= Paradidactylia shantungensis =

Scientific classification
- Kingdom: Animalia
- Phylum: Arthropoda
- Clade: Pancrustacea
- Class: Insecta
- Order: Coleoptera
- Suborder: Polyphaga
- Infraorder: Scarabaeiformia
- Family: Scarabaeidae
- Genus: Paradidactylia
- Species: P. shantungensis

Binomial name
- Paradidactylia shantungensis (Balthasar, 1941)

Synonyms
- Aphodius (Trichonotulus) shantungensis Balthasar, 1941; Aphodius (Phalacronothus) pseudoavunculus Masumoto, 1977

Species of beetle

Paradidactylia shantungensis is a species of beetle of the family Scarabaeidae. It is found in China (Shandong), Indonesia, Thailand and Vietnam.

== Description ==
Adults reach a length of about 3.2 mm (0.13 in). The dorsal surface is rather dull. They are dark yellowish-brown to brown, with the back of the head and the disc of the pronotum somewhat darkened. The elytra are covered with fine, sparse hairs. The legs are light reddish-brown.
