= Paradidactylia kathmandui =

Scientific classification
- Kingdom: Animalia
- Phylum: Arthropoda
- Clade: Pancrustacea
- Class: Insecta
- Order: Coleoptera
- Suborder: Polyphaga
- Infraorder: Scarabaeiformia
- Family: Scarabaeidae
- Genus: Paradidactylia
- Species: P. kathmandui

Binomial name
- Paradidactylia kathmandui (Stebnicka, 1985)

Synonyms
- Aphodius (Paradidactylia) kathmandui Stebnicka, 1985

Species of beetle

Paradidactylia kathmandui is a species of beetle of the family Scarabaeidae. It is found in Nepal and Pakistan.

== Description ==
Adults reach a length of about 2.8–3.5 mm (0.11–0.14 in). They have an elongate-oval, yellowish-brown body, with the posterior of the head darkened.
