= Paradidactylia venalis =

Scientific classification
- Kingdom: Animalia
- Phylum: Arthropoda
- Clade: Pancrustacea
- Class: Insecta
- Order: Coleoptera
- Suborder: Polyphaga
- Infraorder: Scarabaeiformia
- Family: Scarabaeidae
- Genus: Paradidactylia
- Species: P. venalis

Binomial name
- Paradidactylia venalis (Schmidt, 1910)

Synonyms
- Aphodius venalis Schmidt, 1910

Species of beetle

Paradidactylia venalis is a species of beetle of the family Scarabaeidae. It is found in Burkina Faso, Ivory Coast, Niger, the Democratic Republic of the Congo, Senegal and Togo.

== Description ==
Adults reach a length of about 3 mm (0.12 in). They have a dull, brown body, with the spots on the pronotum and the stripes on the elytra glossy.
