= Paradidactylia haafi =

Scientific classification
- Kingdom: Animalia
- Phylum: Arthropoda
- Clade: Pancrustacea
- Class: Insecta
- Order: Coleoptera
- Suborder: Polyphaga
- Infraorder: Scarabaeiformia
- Family: Scarabaeidae
- Genus: Paradidactylia
- Species: P. haafi

Binomial name
- Paradidactylia haafi (Petrovitz, 1961)

Synonyms
- Aphodius (Phalacronothus) haafi Petrovitz, 1961

Species of beetle

Paradidactylia haafi is a species of beetle of the family Scarabaeidae. It is found in India (Maharashtra), Sri Lanka and Nepal.

== Description ==
Adults reach a length of about 3.8–4.3 mm (0.15–0.17 in). They have a narrowly oval, slightly convex, highly glossy, light reddish-brown body, with part of the head and the pronotum darker. The underside is yellowish-brown.
