= Paradidactylia biseriata =

Scientific classification
- Kingdom: Animalia
- Phylum: Arthropoda
- Clade: Pancrustacea
- Class: Insecta
- Order: Coleoptera
- Suborder: Polyphaga
- Infraorder: Scarabaeiformia
- Family: Scarabaeidae
- Genus: Paradidactylia
- Species: P. biseriata

Binomial name
- Paradidactylia biseriata (Schmidt, 1908)

Synonyms
- Aphodius biseriatus Schmidt, 1908; Aphodius (Paradidactylia) dehradunensis Petrovitz, 1961

Species of beetle

Paradidactylia biseriata is a species of beetle of the family Scarabaeidae. It is found in Indonesia, Sri Lanka, Thailand, Inida (Uttarakhand) and Nepal.

== Description ==
Adults reach a length of about 3.5–4 mm (0.14–0.16 in). They are dark castaneous, with the upper surface shortly piliferous.
