= Paradidactylia ovatula =

Scientific classification
- Kingdom: Animalia
- Phylum: Arthropoda
- Clade: Pancrustacea
- Class: Insecta
- Order: Coleoptera
- Suborder: Polyphaga
- Infraorder: Scarabaeiformia
- Family: Scarabaeidae
- Genus: Paradidactylia
- Species: P. ovatula

Binomial name
- Paradidactylia ovatula (Harold, 1861)

Synonyms
- Aphodius ovatulus Harold, 1861; Aphodius (Mesontoplatys) ovatulus numerosus Schmidt, 1914

Species of beetle

Paradidactylia ovatula is a species of dung beetle found in Nepal, Sri Lanka, India (Kerala, Rajasthan) and Indonesia (Java).

== Description ==
Adults reach a length of about 3–4 mm (0.12–0.16 in). They have a strongly convex, shiny, yellow-brown body, with the head and the disc of the pronotum darker brown. There is a triangular scutellar spot on the elytra. The legs are reddish-yellow.
