= Paradidactylia venaloides =

Scientific classification
- Kingdom: Animalia
- Phylum: Arthropoda
- Clade: Pancrustacea
- Class: Insecta
- Order: Coleoptera
- Suborder: Polyphaga
- Infraorder: Scarabaeiformia
- Family: Scarabaeidae
- Genus: Paradidactylia
- Species: P. venaloides

Binomial name
- Paradidactylia venaloides (Endrödi, 1960)

Synonyms
- Aphodius (Paradidactylia) venaloides Endrödi, 1960; Aphodius excisicollis Müller, 1941; Paradidactylia atra Balthasar, 1937

Species of beetle

Paradidactylia venaloides is a species of beetle of the family Scarabaeidae. It is found in Burundi, Ethiopia, Ghana, Ivory Coast, Kenya, the Democratic Republic of the Congo, Guinea, Rwanda, Tanzania and Uganda.

== Description ==
Adults reach a length of about 2.5–3.5 mm (0.098–0.138 in). They have an oval-elongate, convex, rather dull, glabrous, brown-blackish body, sometimes with the elytra and legs dark brown-reddish.
