= Paradidactylia brivioi =

Scientific classification
- Kingdom: Animalia
- Phylum: Arthropoda
- Clade: Pancrustacea
- Class: Insecta
- Order: Coleoptera
- Suborder: Polyphaga
- Infraorder: Scarabaeiformia
- Family: Scarabaeidae
- Genus: Paradidactylia
- Species: P. brivioi

Binomial name
- Paradidactylia brivioi (Petrovitz, 1961)

Synonyms
- Aphodius (Paradidactylia) brivioi Petrovitz, 1961

Species of beetle

Paradidactylia brivioi is a species of beetle of the family Scarabaeidae. It is found in India (Andhra Pradesh).

== Description ==
Adults reach a length of about 3.5–3.7 mm (0.14–0.15 in). They have an elongate-oval, flattened body. The head and pronotum are translucent reddish-brown, while the elytra are dull, somewhat darker brown and finely pubescent.
