= Paradidactylia avuncula =

Scientific classification
- Kingdom: Animalia
- Phylum: Arthropoda
- Clade: Pancrustacea
- Class: Insecta
- Order: Coleoptera
- Suborder: Polyphaga
- Infraorder: Scarabaeiformia
- Family: Scarabaeidae
- Genus: Paradidactylia
- Species: P. avuncula

Binomial name
- Paradidactylia avuncula (Balthasar, 1946)

Synonyms
- Aphodius (Phalacronothus) avunculus Balthasar, 1946

Species of beetle

Paradidactylia avuncula is a species of beetle of the family Scarabaeidae. It is found in India (Rajasthan), Sri Lanka and Taiwan.

== Description ==
Adults reach a length of about 3 mm (0.12 in). They have an elongate, rather parallel-sided, brown body, with the front of the head and the sides of the pronotum yellowish-brown. They are not very shiny, with the elytra even duller and with some short hairs along the sides and toward the apex. The legs are yellowish-red.
