= Paradidactylia carinulata =

Scientific classification
- Kingdom: Animalia
- Phylum: Arthropoda
- Clade: Pancrustacea
- Class: Insecta
- Order: Coleoptera
- Suborder: Polyphaga
- Infraorder: Scarabaeiformia
- Family: Scarabaeidae
- Genus: Paradidactylia
- Species: P. carinulata

Binomial name
- Paradidactylia carinulata (Motschulsky, 1863)

Synonyms
- Phalacronothus carinulatus Motschulsky, 1863

Species of beetle

Paradidactylia carinulata is a species of dung beetle native to India (Goa, Rajasthan) and Sri Lanka.

== Description ==
Adults reach a length of about 4 mm (0.16 in). They have an elongate, moderately convex body. The forebody is fairly shiny, while the elytra have a somewhat greasy luster, and appear duller. They are dark chestnut-brown, with the disc of the pronotum somewhat darker.
