= Paradidactylia wichei =

Scientific classification
- Kingdom: Animalia
- Phylum: Arthropoda
- Clade: Pancrustacea
- Class: Insecta
- Order: Coleoptera
- Suborder: Polyphaga
- Infraorder: Scarabaeiformia
- Family: Scarabaeidae
- Genus: Paradidactylia
- Species: P. wichei

Binomial name
- Paradidactylia wichei (Petrovitz, 1961)

Synonyms
- Aphodius (Paradidactylia) wichei Petrovitz, 1961; Aphodius (Trichonotulus) coimbatorensis Balthasar, 1973

Species of beetle

Paradidactylia wichei is a species of beetle of the family Scarabaeidae. It is found in Pakistan, India (Rajasthan, Tamil Nadu) and Sri Lanka.

== Description ==
Adults reach a length of about 2.2–3.2 mm (0.087–0.126 in). They are dark brown or dark castaneous, with the upper surface minutely pubescent.
