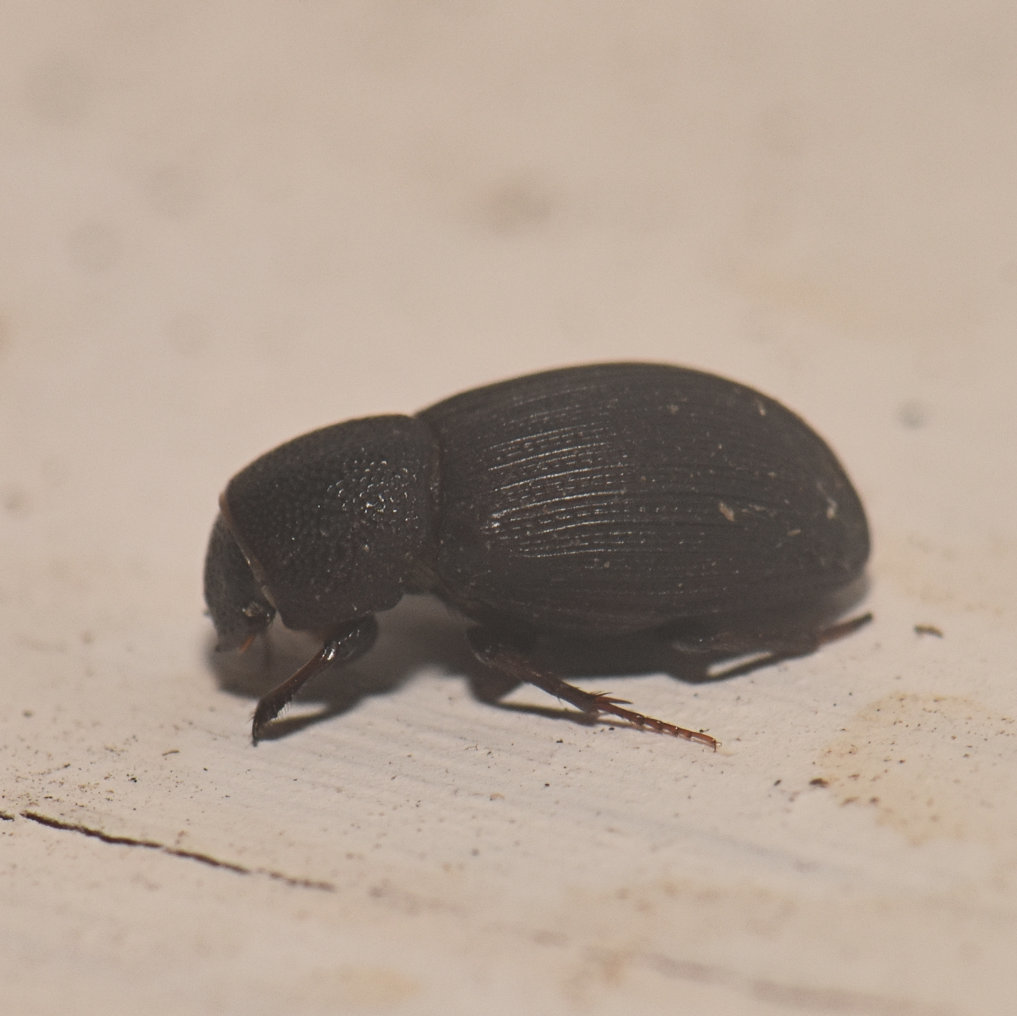

Scientific classification
- Kingdom: Animalia
- Phylum: Arthropoda
- Clade: Pancrustacea
- Class: Insecta
- Order: Coleoptera
- Suborder: Polyphaga
- Infraorder: Scarabaeiformia
- Family: Scarabaeidae
- Genus: Dialytes
- Species: D. ulkei

Binomial name
- Dialytes ulkei Horn, 1875

= Dialytes ulkei =

Species of beetle

Dialytes ulkei is a species of aphodiine dung beetle in the family Scarabaeidae. It is found in Canada (Ontario, Quebec) and the United States (Colorado, Iowa, Maryland, South Carolina, Wisconsin).
