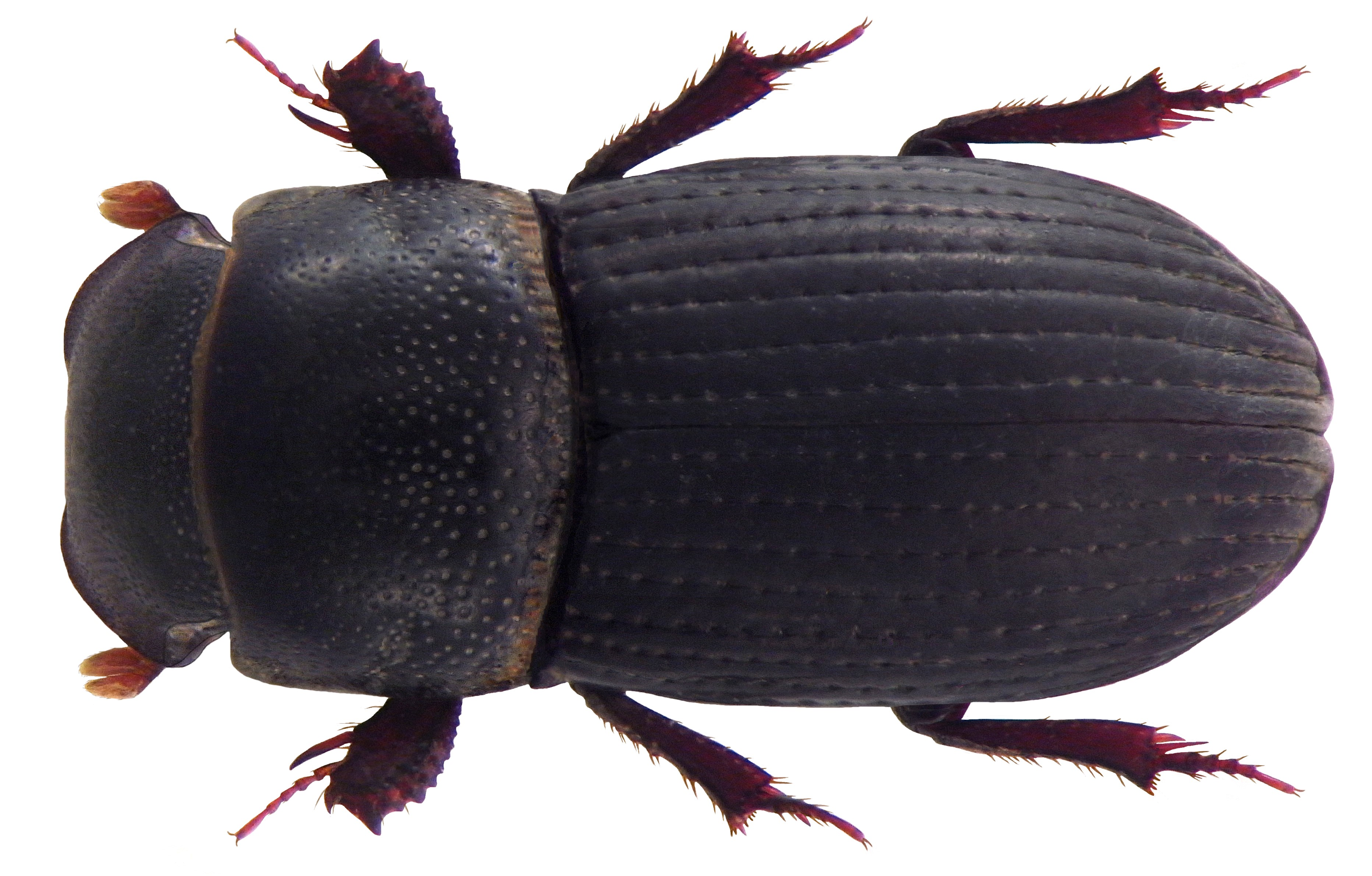
- Dialytes monstrosus, Indonesia

Scientific classification
- Kingdom: Animalia
- Phylum: Arthropoda
- Clade: Pancrustacea
- Class: Insecta
- Order: Coleoptera
- Suborder: Polyphaga
- Infraorder: Scarabaeiformia
- Family: Scarabaeidae
- Subfamily: Aphodiinae
- Tribe: Aphodiini
- Genus: Dialytes; Harold, 1869

= Dialytes =

Genus of beetles

Dialytes is a genus of aphodiine dung beetles in the family Scarabaeidae. There are about five described species in Dialytes.

== Species ==
These five species belong to the genus Dialytes:

- Dialytes criddlei Brown, 1929
- Dialytes striatulus (Say, 1825)
- Dialytes truncatus (Melsheimer, 1845)
- Dialytes ulkei Horn, 1875
- Dialytes umbratus Balthasar, 1941
