= Dialytes truncatus =

Scientific classification
- Kingdom: Animalia
- Phylum: Arthropoda
- Clade: Pancrustacea
- Class: Insecta
- Order: Coleoptera
- Suborder: Polyphaga
- Infraorder: Scarabaeiformia
- Family: Scarabaeidae
- Genus: Dialytes
- Species: D. truncatus

Binomial name
- Dialytes truncatus (Melsheimer, 1845)

Synonyms
- Aphodius corvinus Haldeman, 1848; Aphodius truncatus Melsheimer, 1845; Aphodius fuliginosus Dejean, 1833

Species of beetle

Dialytes truncatus is a species of aphodiine dung beetle in the family Scarabaeidae. It is found in Canada (Ontario, Quebec) and the United States (Georgia, Illinois, Iowa, Maryland, Oklahoma, South Carolina, Virginia, Wisconsin).
