= Dialytes striatulus =

Scientific classification
- Kingdom: Animalia
- Phylum: Arthropoda
- Clade: Pancrustacea
- Class: Insecta
- Order: Coleoptera
- Suborder: Polyphaga
- Infraorder: Scarabaeiformia
- Family: Scarabaeidae
- Genus: Dialytes
- Species: D. striatulus

Binomial name
- Dialytes striatulus (Say, 1825)

Synonyms
- Trox striatulus Say, 1825; Rhyssemus cribrosus LeConte, 1850

Species of beetle

Dialytes striatulus is a species of aphodiine dung beetle in the family Scarabaeidae. It is found in Canada (Manitoba, New Brunswick, Nova Scotia, Ontario, Prince Edward Island, Quebec) and the United States (Georgia, Iowa, Kentucky, Maryland, Mississippi, Nebraska, South Carolina, Wisconsin).

== Description ==
Adults reach a length of about 4–5 mm (0.16–0.20 in). They have an oblong, convex, glabrous body. The head and pronotum are nearly dull, while the elytra are shiny. They are piceous-brown, with the antennae and legs reddish.
