= Gonaphodioides skelleyi =

Scientific classification
- Kingdom: Animalia
- Phylum: Arthropoda
- Clade: Pancrustacea
- Class: Insecta
- Order: Coleoptera
- Suborder: Polyphaga
- Infraorder: Scarabaeiformia
- Family: Scarabaeidae
- Genus: Gonaphodioides
- Species: G. skelleyi

Binomial name
- Gonaphodioides skelleyi Dellacasa, Dellacasa & Gordon, 2012

Species of beetle

Gonaphodioides skelleyi is a species of beetle of the family Scarabaeidae. It is found in Mexico (Chiapas).

== Description ==
Adults reach a length of about 5–6 mm (0.20–0.24 in). They have an oblong, rather convex, moderately shiny, glabrous, black body, with the tarsi and club of the antennae dark piceous.

== Etymology ==
The species is named in honour of Paul E. Skelley.

== Life history ==
Specimens have been collected in horse dung.
