= Gonaphodioides columbicus =

Scientific classification
- Kingdom: Animalia
- Phylum: Arthropoda
- Clade: Pancrustacea
- Class: Insecta
- Order: Coleoptera
- Suborder: Polyphaga
- Infraorder: Scarabaeiformia
- Family: Scarabaeidae
- Genus: Gonaphodioides
- Species: G. columbicus

Binomial name
- Gonaphodioides columbicus (Harold, 1880)

Synonyms
- Aphodius columbicus Harold, 1880

Species of beetle

Gonaphodioides columbicus is a species of beetle of the family Scarabaeidae. It is found in Colombia and Venezuela.

== Description ==
Adults reach a length of about 4–5 mm (0.16–0.20 in). They have an elongate, moderately convex, shiny, glabrous, chestnut-brown body, with the margin of the clypeus, sides of the pronotum and apex of the elytra reddish. The legs are pale reddish and the club of the antennae is testaceous.
