= Gonaphodioides chapini =

Scientific classification
- Kingdom: Animalia
- Phylum: Arthropoda
- Clade: Pancrustacea
- Class: Insecta
- Order: Coleoptera
- Suborder: Polyphaga
- Infraorder: Scarabaeiformia
- Family: Scarabaeidae
- Genus: Gonaphodioides
- Species: G. chapini

Binomial name
- Gonaphodioides chapini (Hinton, 1934)

Synonyms
- Aphodius chapini Hinton, 1934; Aphodius (Blackburneus) castanescens Petrovitz, 1973; Aphodius ataeniodes Hinton, 1938

Species of beetle

Gonaphodioides chapini is a species of beetle of the family Scarabaeidae. It is found in Brazil (Acre), Costa Rica, Ecuador, Mexico (Oaxaca), Panama, Peru and Venezuela.

== Description ==
Adults reach a length of about 4–4.5 mm (0.16–0.18 in). The body is dark testaceous. The pronotum has moderate, somewhat equally distant punctures. The punctures are laterally closer. The elytral interstriae are convex.

== Life history ==
Specimens have been collected at altitudes up to 1300 metres. They are attracted to pig, human and horse dung.
