= Gonaphodioides zempoaltepetlensis =

Scientific classification
- Kingdom: Animalia
- Phylum: Arthropoda
- Clade: Pancrustacea
- Class: Insecta
- Order: Coleoptera
- Suborder: Polyphaga
- Infraorder: Scarabaeiformia
- Family: Scarabaeidae
- Genus: Gonaphodioides
- Species: G. zempoaltepetlensis

Binomial name
- Gonaphodioides zempoaltepetlensis Dellacasa, Dellacasa & Arriaga-Jiménez, 2018

Species of beetle

Gonaphodioides zempoaltepetlensis is a species of beetle of the family Scarabaeidae. It is found in Mexico (Oaxaca).

== Description ==
Adults reach a length of about 4.5–5 mm (0.18–0.20 in). They have an oval-elongate, moderately convex, rather shiny, glabrous, chestnut-brown body. Part of the head and the sides of the pronotum are paler and the apex of the elytra is yellowish-brown. The legs are brown and the club of the antennae is dark brown. The underside is dark brown.

== Etymology ==
The species is named after the type locality, Zempoaltépetl (Oaxaca, Mexico).
