= Gonaphodioides =

Scientific classification
- Kingdom: Animalia
- Phylum: Arthropoda
- Clade: Pancrustacea
- Class: Insecta
- Order: Coleoptera
- Suborder: Polyphaga
- Infraorder: Scarabaeiformia
- Family: Scarabaeidae
- Subfamily: Aphodiinae
- Tribe: Aphodiini
- Genus: Gonaphodioides; Dellacasa, Dellacasa & Gordon, 2012

Genus of beetles

Gonaphodioides is a genus of beetles of the family Scarabaeidae.

== Species ==
- Gonaphodioides acutecernans (Balthasar, 1960)
- Gonaphodioides cartwrighti Dellacasa, Dellacasa & Gordon, 2013
- Gonaphodioides chapini (Hinton, 1934)
- Gonaphodioides columbicus (Harold, 1880)
- Gonaphodioides newtoni Dellacasa, Dellacasa & Gordon, 2012
- Gonaphodioides ratcliffei Dellacasa, Dellacasa & Gordon, 2012
- Gonaphodioides sincerus (Petrovitz, 1973)
- Gonaphodioides skelleyi Dellacasa, Dellacasa & Gordon, 2012
- Gonaphodioides zempoaltepetlensis Dellacasa, Dellacasa & Arriaga-Jiménez, 2018
