= Gonaphodioides acutecernans =

Scientific classification
- Kingdom: Animalia
- Phylum: Arthropoda
- Clade: Pancrustacea
- Class: Insecta
- Order: Coleoptera
- Suborder: Polyphaga
- Infraorder: Scarabaeiformia
- Family: Scarabaeidae
- Genus: Gonaphodioides
- Species: G. acutecernans

Binomial name
- Gonaphodioides acutecernans (Balthasar, 1960)

Synonyms
- Aphodius (Gonaphodius) acutecernans Balthasar, 1960

Species of beetle

Gonaphodioides acutecernans is a species of beetle of the family Scarabaeidae. It is found in Bolivia and Colombia.

== Description ==
Adults reach a length of about 5.5–6 mm (0.22–0.24 in). They have an elongate, moderately convex, shiny, glabrous, chestnut-brown body, with the margin of the clypeus and the sides of the pronotum reddish. The legs are brown-reddish and the club of the antennae is testaceous.
