= Gonaphodioides sincerus =

Scientific classification
- Kingdom: Animalia
- Phylum: Arthropoda
- Clade: Pancrustacea
- Class: Insecta
- Order: Coleoptera
- Suborder: Polyphaga
- Infraorder: Scarabaeiformia
- Family: Scarabaeidae
- Genus: Gonaphodioides
- Species: G. sincerus

Binomial name
- Gonaphodioides sincerus (Petrovitz, 1973)

Synonyms
- Aphodius sincerus Petrovitz, 1973

Species of beetle

Gonaphodioides sincerus is a species of beetle of the family Scarabaeidae. It is found in Bolivia, Brazil (Amazonas, Distrito Federal, Mato Grosso, Rio de Janeiro, Rondônia, São Paulo) and Paraguay.

== Description ==
Adults reach a length of about 3.5–4 mm (0.14–0.16 in). The body is light reddish testaceous. The pronotum is scarcely and finely punctate on the disc, with the lateral punctures closer and larger. The interstriae on the disc of the elytra are flat.

== Life history ==
They appear to be attracted to pig dung.
