= Gonaphodioides newtoni =

Scientific classification
- Kingdom: Animalia
- Phylum: Arthropoda
- Clade: Pancrustacea
- Class: Insecta
- Order: Coleoptera
- Suborder: Polyphaga
- Infraorder: Scarabaeiformia
- Family: Scarabaeidae
- Genus: Gonaphodioides
- Species: G. newtoni

Binomial name
- Gonaphodioides newtoni Dellacasa, Dellacasa & Gordon, 2012

Species of beetle

Gonaphodioides newtoni is a species of beetle of the family Scarabaeidae. It is found in Mexico (Hidalgo, Puebla, San Luis Potosí).

== Description ==
Adults reach a length of about 4–4.5 mm (0.16–0.18 in). They have a moderately elongate, rather convex, shiny, glabrous, dark brown body. The margin of the clypeus, anterior angles of the pronotum and apex of the elytra are all paler and the legs are dark reddish-brown. The club of the antennae is dirty testaceous.

== Etymology ==
The species is named in honour of Alfred Newton.
