= Gonaphodioides ratcliffei =

Scientific classification
- Kingdom: Animalia
- Phylum: Arthropoda
- Clade: Pancrustacea
- Class: Insecta
- Order: Coleoptera
- Suborder: Polyphaga
- Infraorder: Scarabaeiformia
- Family: Scarabaeidae
- Genus: Gonaphodioides
- Species: G. ratcliffei

Binomial name
- Gonaphodioides ratcliffei Dellacasa, Dellacasa & Gordon, 2012

Species of beetle

Gonaphodioides ratcliffei is a species of beetle of the family Scarabaeidae. It is found in Mexico (Oaxaca).

== Description ==
Adults reach a length of about 3.5–4 mm (0.14–0.16 in). They have an elongate, moderately convex, rather shiny, glabrous, dark chestnut-brown body. The margin of the clypeus, anterior angles of the pronotum and apex of the elytra are all paler and the legs are reddish-brown. The club of the antennae is brownish-red.

== Etymology ==
The species is named in honour of Brett Ratcliffe.
