= Gonaphodioides cartwrighti =

Scientific classification
- Kingdom: Animalia
- Phylum: Arthropoda
- Clade: Pancrustacea
- Class: Insecta
- Order: Coleoptera
- Suborder: Polyphaga
- Infraorder: Scarabaeiformia
- Family: Scarabaeidae
- Genus: Gonaphodioides
- Species: G. cartwrighti

Binomial name
- Gonaphodioides cartwrighti Dellacasa, Dellacasa & Gordon, 2013

Species of beetle

Gonaphodioides cartwrighti is a species of beetle of the family Scarabaeidae. It is found in El Salvador.

== Description ==
Adults reach a length of about 3.5–4 mm (0.14–0.16 in). They have an elongate, convex, moderately shiny, glabrous, piceous-black body. The margin of the clypeus and sides of the pronotum are reddish-brown and the elytra have yellowish spots. The legs are reddish-brown and the club of the antennae is piceous.

== Etymology ==
The species is named in honour of the Coleopterologist Oscar L. Cartwright.
