= Adeloparius nobilis =

Scientific classification
- Kingdom: Animalia
- Phylum: Arthropoda
- Clade: Pancrustacea
- Class: Insecta
- Order: Coleoptera
- Suborder: Polyphaga
- Infraorder: Scarabaeiformia
- Family: Scarabaeidae
- Genus: Adeloparius
- Species: A. nobilis

Binomial name
- Adeloparius nobilis (Harold, 1874)

Synonyms
- Aphodius nobilis Harold, 1874; Aphodius (Adeloparius) septemmaculatus decorellus Endrödi, 1960; Aphodius (Adeloparius) septemmaculatus decorus Endrödi, 1960; Aphodius (Adeloparius) zygomaticus Müller, 1942; Aphodius nigrosignatus Péringuey, 1885; Aphodius holubi Dohrn, 1883; Aphodius binotatus Thunberg, 1818

Species of beetle

Adeloparius nobilis is a species of beetle of the family Scarabaeidae. It is found in Ethiopia, the Democratic Republic of the Congo, South Africa (Limpopo) and Somalia.

== Description ==
Adults reach a length of about 9–11 mm (0.35–0.43 in). They are very variable in colour, ranging from almost entirely black to reddish-yellow with a few small black spots.
