= Adeloparius endroedii =

Scientific classification
- Kingdom: Animalia
- Phylum: Arthropoda
- Clade: Pancrustacea
- Class: Insecta
- Order: Coleoptera
- Suborder: Polyphaga
- Infraorder: Scarabaeiformia
- Family: Scarabaeidae
- Genus: Adeloparius
- Species: A. endroedii

Binomial name
- Adeloparius endroedii (Landin, 1959)

Synonyms
- Aphodius (Adeloparius) endroedii Landin, 1959

Species of beetle

Adeloparius endroedii is a species of beetle of the family Scarabaeidae. It is found in Cameroon, Kenya, the Democratic Republic of the Congo, the Republic of the Congo and Rwanda.

== Description ==
Adults reach a length of about 13–14 mm (0.51–0.55 in). They have a dark brown body, with the head lighter brownish or red-yellowsh and with an anterior dark spot. The lateral margins and the median line of the pronotum are red-yellowish and the elytra are light colored along the sides and at the apex. The underside is light brownish or yellowish and the legs and antennae are reddish-brown.

== Etymology ==
The species is named in honour of Dr. Sebo Endrodi.
