= Adeloparius blattoides =

Scientific classification
- Kingdom: Animalia
- Phylum: Arthropoda
- Clade: Pancrustacea
- Class: Insecta
- Order: Coleoptera
- Suborder: Polyphaga
- Infraorder: Scarabaeiformia
- Family: Scarabaeidae
- Genus: Adeloparius
- Species: A. blattoides

Binomial name
- Adeloparius blattoides (Landin, 1959)

Synonyms
- Aphodius (Adeloparius) blattoides Landin, 1959

Species of beetle

Adeloparius blattoides is a species of beetle of the family Scarabaeidae. It is found in the Democratic Republic of the Congo.

== Description ==
Adults reach a length of about 12.5 mm (0.49 in). They have a broadly elongate, fairly convex, brownish body. The pronotum has two large elongate black spots (one on each side). The legs and antennae are lighter yellowish.
