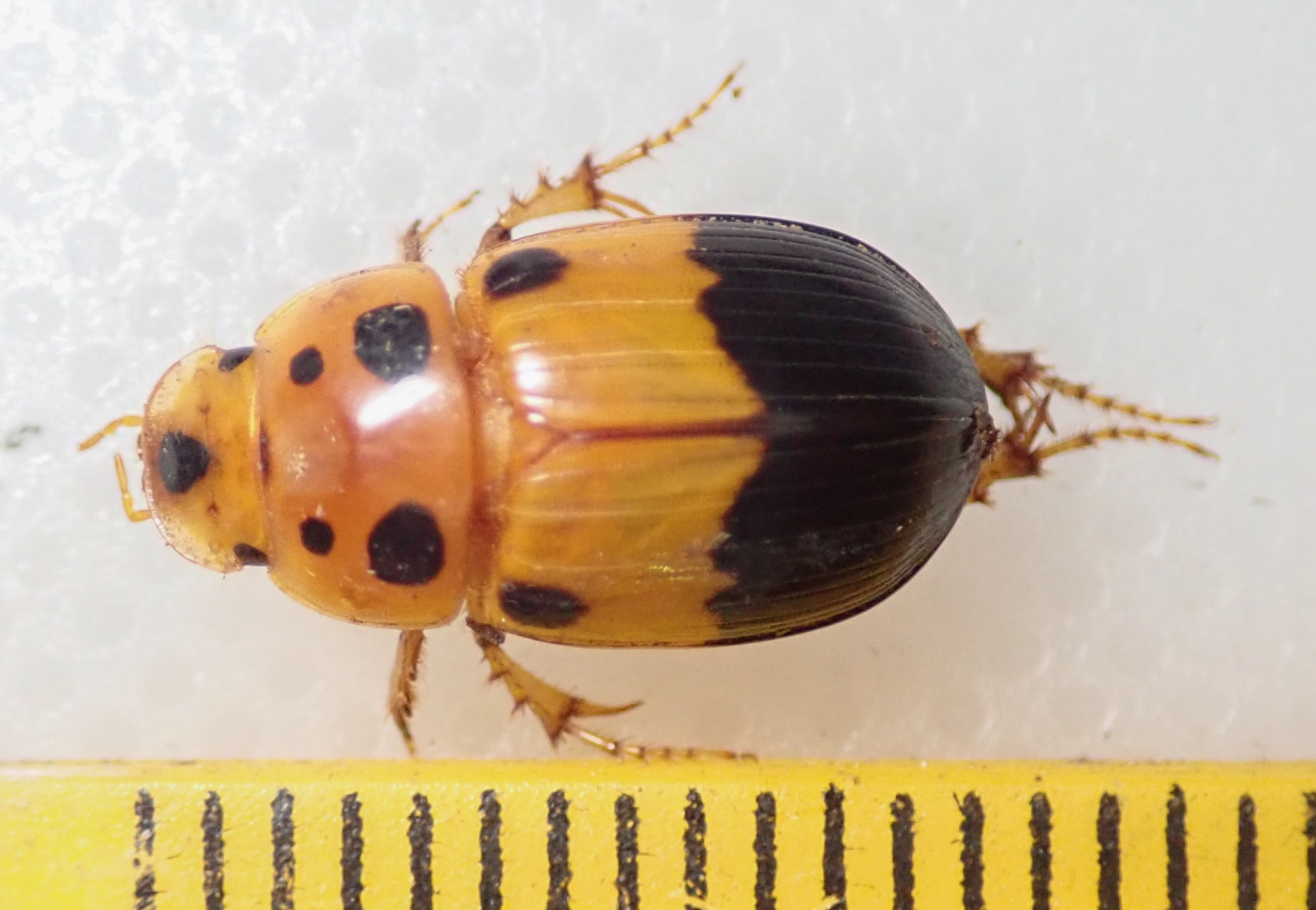
- Adeloparius septemmaculatus

Scientific classification
- Kingdom: Animalia
- Phylum: Arthropoda
- Clade: Pancrustacea
- Class: Insecta
- Order: Coleoptera
- Suborder: Polyphaga
- Infraorder: Scarabaeiformia
- Family: Scarabaeidae
- Subfamily: Aphodiinae
- Tribe: Aphodiini
- Genus: Adeloparius; Schmidt, 1914

Synonyms
- Aphodius (Adeloparius) Schmidt, 1914

= Adeloparius =

Genus of beetles

Adeloparius is a genus of beetles of the family Scarabaeidae.

== Species ==
- Adeloparius blattoides (Landin, 1959)
- Adeloparius endroedii (Landin, 1959)
- Adeloparius formosus Paulian, 1942
- Adeloparius lemoulti (Koshantschikov, 1916)
- Adeloparius luridipes (Harold, 1861)
- Adeloparius nobilis (Harold, 1874)
- Adeloparius overlaeti (Boucomont, 1936)
- Adeloparius pulcherrimus (Reiche, 1850)
- Adeloparius septemmaculatus (Fabricius, 1781)
- Adeloparius trimaculatus (Schmidt, 1909)
- Adeloparius vethi (Lansberge, 1886)
- Adeloparius wahlbergi (Boheman, 1857)
- Adeloparius wittei Paulian, 1942
