= Adeloparius trimaculatus =

Scientific classification
- Kingdom: Animalia
- Phylum: Arthropoda
- Clade: Pancrustacea
- Class: Insecta
- Order: Coleoptera
- Suborder: Polyphaga
- Infraorder: Scarabaeiformia
- Family: Scarabaeidae
- Genus: Adeloparius
- Species: A. trimaculatus

Binomial name
- Adeloparius trimaculatus (Schmidt, 1909)

Synonyms
- Aphodius trimaculatus Schmidt, 1909

Species of beetle

Adeloparius trimaculatus is a species of beetle of the family Scarabaeidae. It is found in the Democratic Republic of the Congo and Cameroon.

== Description ==
Adults reach a length of about 12–13 mm (0.47–0.51 in). They have a widely oval, convex, shiny, glabrous body, with the head and pronotum shiny orange and more bright than the elytra.
