= Adeloparius wahlbergi =

Scientific classification
- Kingdom: Animalia
- Phylum: Arthropoda
- Clade: Pancrustacea
- Class: Insecta
- Order: Coleoptera
- Suborder: Polyphaga
- Infraorder: Scarabaeiformia
- Family: Scarabaeidae
- Genus: Adeloparius
- Species: A. wahlbergi

Binomial name
- Adeloparius wahlbergi (Boheman, 1857)

Synonyms
- Aphodius wahlbergi Boheman, 1857; Aphodius smithi Shipp, 1897

Species of beetle

Adeloparius wahlbergi is a species of beetle of the family Scarabaeidae. It is found in South Africa (KwaZulu-Natal, North West).

== Description ==
Adults reach a length of about 9–10 mm (0.35–0.39 in). They have a flavous, shining body. The prothorax is smooth, with four black patches in the median part of the disk. The elytra are very finely punctato-striate, with a black bi-sinuate band extending across the elytra, covering about one-third of the whole surface and at the apex are two round black spots.
