= Lorditomaeus collartoides =

Scientific classification
- Kingdom: Animalia
- Phylum: Arthropoda
- Clade: Pancrustacea
- Class: Insecta
- Order: Coleoptera
- Suborder: Polyphaga
- Infraorder: Scarabaeiformia
- Family: Scarabaeidae
- Genus: Lorditomaeus
- Species: L. collartoides

Binomial name
- Lorditomaeus collartoides Bellmann, 2023

Species of beetle

Lorditomaeus collartoides is a species of beetle of the family Scarabaeidae. It is found in Benin, Burkina Faso, Cameroon, Gambia, Ghana, Kenya, Mali, Nigeria, the Democratic Republic of the Congo, Senegal and Sudan.

== Description ==
Adults reach a length of about 5.5–7 mm (0.22–0.28 in). They have a broadly oval, feebly convex, weakly shiny, setaceous, brown body. The head, pronotum and elytra have pale lateral margins and elytral intervals 2, 3, 6 and 7 are yellowish basally. The apex of the elytra has a light spot, which is dark anteriorly.

== Etymology ==
The species name refers to its similarity to Lorditomaeus collarti.
