= Lorditomaeus pseudopatroides =

Scientific classification
- Kingdom: Animalia
- Phylum: Arthropoda
- Clade: Pancrustacea
- Class: Insecta
- Order: Coleoptera
- Suborder: Polyphaga
- Infraorder: Scarabaeiformia
- Family: Scarabaeidae
- Genus: Lorditomaeus
- Species: L. pseudopatroides

Binomial name
- Lorditomaeus pseudopatroides Bellmann, 2023

Species of beetle

Lorditomaeus pseudopatroides is a species of beetle of the family Scarabaeidae. It is found in Angola.

== Description ==
Adults reach a length of about 5.8–6.5 mm (0.23–0.26 in). They have a broadly oval, feebly convex, weakly shiny, setaceous, light brown body. The head, pronotum and elytra have pale lateral margins and elytral intervals 2, 3, 6 and 7 are yellowish basally. The elytral apex has a light spot, which is dark anteriorly.

== Etymology ==
The species name refers to its similarity to Lorditomaeus opatroides.
