= Lorditomaeus rothi =

Scientific classification
- Kingdom: Animalia
- Phylum: Arthropoda
- Clade: Pancrustacea
- Class: Insecta
- Order: Coleoptera
- Suborder: Polyphaga
- Infraorder: Scarabaeiformia
- Family: Scarabaeidae
- Genus: Lorditomaeus
- Species: L. rothi

Binomial name
- Lorditomaeus rothi Bellmann, 2023

Synonyms
- Aphodius deplanatus Roth, 1851

Species of beetle

Lorditomaeus rothi is a species of beetle of the family Scarabaeidae. It is found in Eritrea, Ethiopia, Kenya, Tanzania and Uganda.

== Description ==
Adults reach a length of about 6–7 mm (0.24–0.28 in). They have a broadly oval, feebly convex, weakly shiny, setaceous, light-brown body. The head, pronotum and elytra have pale lateral margins, and elytral interval 2, 3, 6 and 7 are yellowish basally.
