= Lorditomaeus bordati =

Scientific classification
- Kingdom: Animalia
- Phylum: Arthropoda
- Clade: Pancrustacea
- Class: Insecta
- Order: Coleoptera
- Suborder: Polyphaga
- Infraorder: Scarabaeiformia
- Family: Scarabaeidae
- Genus: Lorditomaeus
- Species: L. bordati

Binomial name
- Lorditomaeus bordati Bellmann, 2023

Species of beetle

Lorditomaeus bordati is a species of beetle of the family Scarabaeidae. It is found in Ethiopia.

== Description ==
Adults reach a length of about 6.6–7.7 mm (0.26–0.30 in). They have a broadly oval, feebly convex, weakly shiny, setaceous, brown body. The head, pronotum and elytra have pale lateral margins and elytral intervals 2, 3, 6 and 7 are yellowish basally.

== Etymology ==
The species is named after Patrice Bordat, a specialist in the Afrotropical Aphodiinae.
