= Lorditomaeus =

Scientific classification
- Kingdom: Animalia
- Phylum: Arthropoda
- Clade: Pancrustacea
- Class: Insecta
- Order: Coleoptera
- Suborder: Polyphaga
- Infraorder: Scarabaeiformia
- Family: Scarabaeidae
- Subfamily: Aphodiinae
- Tribe: Aphodiini
- Genus: Lorditomaeus; Péringuey, 1901

Genus of beetles

Lorditomaeus is a genus of beetles of the family Scarabaeidae.

== Species ==
- Lorditomaeus aequus Schmidt, 1908
- Lorditomaeus anetteae Bellmann, 2023
- Lorditomaeus bifidus Schmidt, 1908
- Lorditomaeus blattoides Petrovitz, 1969
- Lorditomaeus bordati Bellmann, 2023
- Lorditomaeus cambeforti Bordat, 1983
- Lorditomaeus collarti Boucomont, 1932
- Lorditomaeus collartoides Bellmann, 2023
- Lorditomaeus ellenbergeri Paulian, 1942
- Lorditomaeus ferreri Bordat, 1997
- Lorditomaeus fornicatus Schmidt, 1908
- Lorditomaeus fratris Bordat, 1996
- Lorditomaeus horni (Balthasar, 1937)
- Lorditomaeus infuscatus Schmidt, 1908
- Lorditomaeus invenustus Schmidt, 1908
- Lorditomaeus magnus Balthasar, 1965
- Lorditomaeus mirandus Balthasar, 1965
- Lorditomaeus morettoi Bordat, 2000
- Lorditomaeus opatroides (Klug, 1855)
- Lorditomaeus orthochaetus Balthasar, 1965
- Lorditomaeus proditor (Gestro, 1895)
- Lorditomaeus pseudopatroides Bellmann, 2023
- Lorditomaeus rothi Bellmann, 2023
- Lorditomaeus similis Bordat, 1996
- Lorditomaeus tenuis Schmidt, 1908
- Lorditomaeus uhligi Bordat, 1995
- Lorditomaeus youngai Endrödi, 1967
