= Lorditomaeus anetteae =

Scientific classification
- Kingdom: Animalia
- Phylum: Arthropoda
- Clade: Pancrustacea
- Class: Insecta
- Order: Coleoptera
- Suborder: Polyphaga
- Infraorder: Scarabaeiformia
- Family: Scarabaeidae
- Genus: Lorditomaeus
- Species: L. anetteae

Binomial name
- Lorditomaeus anetteae Bellmann, 2023

Species of beetle

Lorditomaeus anetteae is a species of beetle of the family Scarabaeidae. It is found in Ethiopia and Sudan.

== Description ==
Adults reach a length of about 5.6–6.5 mm (0.22–0.26 in). They have a broadly oval, feebly convex, weakly shiny, setaceous, light brown body. The head, pronotum and elytra have pale lateral margins and elytral intervals 2, 3 and 7 are yellowish basally.

== Etymology ==
The species is named after the wife of the author, Anette.
