= Lorditomaeus ellenbergeri =

Scientific classification
- Kingdom: Animalia
- Phylum: Arthropoda
- Clade: Pancrustacea
- Class: Insecta
- Order: Coleoptera
- Suborder: Polyphaga
- Infraorder: Scarabaeiformia
- Family: Scarabaeidae
- Genus: Lorditomaeus
- Species: L. ellenbergeri

Binomial name
- Lorditomaeus ellenbergeri Paulian, 1942

Species of beetle

Lorditomaeus ellenbergeri is a species of beetle of the family Scarabaeidae. It is found in Zimbabwe.

== Description ==
Adults reach a length of about 5.7–6.5 mm (0.22–0.26 in). They have a broadly oval, feebly convex, weakly shiny, setaceous, light brown body. The head, pronotum and elytra have pale lateral margins and the elytral intervals 2, 3, 6 and 7 are yellowish basally. Furthermore, the elytral apex has a light spot, which is dark anteriorly.
