= Lorditomaeus collarti =

Scientific classification
- Kingdom: Animalia
- Phylum: Arthropoda
- Clade: Pancrustacea
- Class: Insecta
- Order: Coleoptera
- Suborder: Polyphaga
- Infraorder: Scarabaeiformia
- Family: Scarabaeidae
- Genus: Lorditomaeus
- Species: L. collarti

Binomial name
- Lorditomaeus collarti Boucomont, 1932

Synonyms
- Lorditomaeus opatroides scutellaris Endrödi, 1957

Species of beetle

Lorditomaeus collarti is a species of beetle of the family Scarabaeidae. It is found in the Democratic Republic of the Congo, Ethiopia, Malawi, Tanzania and Zambia.

== Description ==
Adults reach a length of about 5.8–7 mm (0.23–0.28 in). They have a broadly oval, feebly convex, weakly shiny, setaceous, light brown body. The head, pronotum and elytra have pale lateral margins, and elytral intervals 2, 3, 6 and 7 are yellowish basally.
