= Lorditomaeus opatroides =

Scientific classification
- Kingdom: Animalia
- Phylum: Arthropoda
- Clade: Pancrustacea
- Class: Insecta
- Order: Coleoptera
- Suborder: Polyphaga
- Infraorder: Scarabaeiformia
- Family: Scarabaeidae
- Genus: Lorditomaeus
- Species: L. opatroides

Binomial name
- Lorditomaeus opatroides (Klug, 1855)

Synonyms
- Aphodius opatroides Klug, 1855; Lorditomaeus basilewskyi Balthasar, 1965; Aphodius squalidus Dejean, 1833

Species of beetle

Lorditomaeus opatroides is a species of beetle of the family Scarabaeidae. It is found in Angola, Botswana, Cameroon, the Central African Republic, Chad, Ethiopia, Ghana, Malawi, Mozambique, Namibia, the Democratic Republic of the Congo, Senegal, Sudan, Tanzania, Zambia and Zimbabwe.

== Description ==
Adults reach a length of about 5.5–6.5 mm (0.22–0.26 in). They have a broadly oval, feebly convex, sericeous, pubescent body. The clypeus and the lateral margins of the pronotum and elytra are dark testaceous, the latter with the second, third, sixth and seventh interstices yellowish.
