= Agrilinellus =

Scientific classification
- Kingdom: Animalia
- Phylum: Arthropoda
- Clade: Pancrustacea
- Class: Insecta
- Order: Coleoptera
- Suborder: Polyphaga
- Infraorder: Scarabaeiformia
- Family: Scarabaeidae
- Subfamily: Aphodiinae
- Tribe: Aphodiini
- Genus: Agrilinellus; Dellacasa, Dellacasa & Gordon, 2008

Genus of beetles

Agrilinellus is a genus of beetles of the family Scarabaeidae.

== Species ==
- Agrilinellus abbonai Dellacasa, Dellacasa & Gordon, 2008
- Agrilinellus antonioreyi Dellacasa, Dellacasa & Gordon, 2008
- Agrilinellus azteca (Harold, 1863)
- Agrilinellus chiapasensis (Galante, Stebnicka & Verdu, 2003)
- Agrilinellus nuriae Dellacasa, Dellacasa & Gordon, 2008
- Agrilinellus oaxacaensis Dellacasa, Dellacasa & Gordon, 2008
- Agrilinellus ornatus (Schmidt, 1911)
