= Agrilinellus antonioreyi =

Scientific classification
- Kingdom: Animalia
- Phylum: Arthropoda
- Clade: Pancrustacea
- Class: Insecta
- Order: Coleoptera
- Suborder: Polyphaga
- Infraorder: Scarabaeiformia
- Family: Scarabaeidae
- Genus: Agrilinellus
- Species: A. antonioreyi

Binomial name
- Agrilinellus antonioreyi Dellacasa, Dellacasa & Gordon, 2008

Species of beetle

Agrilinellus antonioreyi is a species of beetle of the family Scarabaeidae. It is found in Mexico (Distrito Federal, Jalisco, México, Michoacán, Puebla, Tlaxcala).

== Description ==
Adults reach a length of about 3–3.5 mm (0.12–0.14 in). They have an oblong, convex body, with the head and pronotum moderately shiny, while the elytra are dull and pubescent. They are blackish brown, although the elytra are sometimes a bit reddish-brown. The legs are dark brown and the antennal club is blackish.

== Life history ==
Specimens have been collected in cattle, horse and sheep dung.

== Etymology ==
The species is named in honour of Dr. Antonio Rey.
