= Agrilinellus ornatus =

Scientific classification
- Kingdom: Animalia
- Phylum: Arthropoda
- Clade: Pancrustacea
- Class: Insecta
- Order: Coleoptera
- Suborder: Polyphaga
- Infraorder: Scarabaeiformia
- Family: Scarabaeidae
- Genus: Agrilinellus
- Species: A. ornatus

Binomial name
- Agrilinellus ornatus (Schmidt, 1911)

Synonyms
- Aphodius ornatus Schmidt, 1911; Aphodius magnopunctatus Hinton, 1934

Species of beetle

Agrilinellus ornatus is a species of beetle of the family Scarabaeidae. It is found in Mexico (Distrito Federal, Durango, Hidalgo, México, Michoacán, Puebla, Tlaxcala, Veracruz).

== Description ==
Adults reach a length of about 3–4 mm (0.12–0.16 in). They have an oblong, convex, shiny, almost glabrous, blackish body. The margin of the clypeus and anterior angles of the pronotum are pale brownish and the elytra are yellowish-brown with the sutural margin and several spots piceous. The legs are dark brown and the antennal club is testaceous.

== Life history ==
Specimens have been collected in cow, horse and sheep dung.
