= Agrilinellus oaxacaensis =

Scientific classification
- Kingdom: Animalia
- Phylum: Arthropoda
- Clade: Pancrustacea
- Class: Insecta
- Order: Coleoptera
- Suborder: Polyphaga
- Infraorder: Scarabaeiformia
- Family: Scarabaeidae
- Genus: Agrilinellus
- Species: A. oaxacaensis

Binomial name
- Agrilinellus oaxacaensis Dellacasa, Dellacasa & Gordon, 2008

Species of beetle

Agrilinellus oaxacaensis is a species of beetle of the family Scarabaeidae. It is found in Mexico (Oaxaca).

== Description ==
Adults reach a length of about 4–4.5 mm (0.16–0.18 in). They have an oval, moderately convex, shiny body. The head and pronotum are glabrous, while the elytra are pubescent. They are reddish brown, with the head and pronotum reddish at the margins and the elytra are yellowish with brownish spots. The legs are brownish-red and the antennal club is reddish.

== Life history ==
Specimens have been collected in horse dung.

== Etymology ==
The species is named after the Mexican State of Oaxaca.
