= Agrilinellus azteca =

Scientific classification
- Kingdom: Animalia
- Phylum: Arthropoda
- Clade: Pancrustacea
- Class: Insecta
- Order: Coleoptera
- Suborder: Polyphaga
- Infraorder: Scarabaeiformia
- Family: Scarabaeidae
- Genus: Agrilinellus
- Species: A. azteca

Binomial name
- Agrilinellus azteca (Harold, 1863)

Synonyms
- Aphodius azteca Harold, 1863; Aphodius multimaculosus Hinton, 1934; Aphodius euprosopus Bates, 1887; Aphodius encaustus Deyrolle, 1863

Species of beetle

Agrilinellus azteca is a species of beetle of the family Scarabaeidae. It is found in Guatemala and Mexico (Distrito Federal, Guerrero, Hidalgo, México, Michoacán, Oaxaca, Puebla, Tabasco, Tlaxcala, Veracruz).

== Description ==
Adults reach a length of about 4–5 mm (0.16–0.20 in). They have an oval, moderately convex, shiny, almost glabrous, blackish body, with the front angles of the pronotum reddish, the legs brownish-red and the antennal club blackish.

== Life history ==
Specimens have been collected in cow, horse and sheep dung.
