= Agrilinellus chiapasensis =

Scientific classification
- Kingdom: Animalia
- Phylum: Arthropoda
- Clade: Pancrustacea
- Class: Insecta
- Order: Coleoptera
- Suborder: Polyphaga
- Infraorder: Scarabaeiformia
- Family: Scarabaeidae
- Genus: Agrilinellus
- Species: A. chiapasensis

Binomial name
- Agrilinellus chiapasensis (Galante, Stebnicka & Verdu, 2003)

Synonyms
- Aphodius (Agrilinus) chiapasensis Galante, Stebnicka & Verdu, 2003

Species of beetle

Agrilinellus chiapasensis is a species of beetle of the family Scarabaeidae. It is found in El Salvador and Mexico (Chiapas).

== Description ==
Adults reach a length of about 3.5–4.5 mm (0.14–0.18 in). They have an oval, convex, moderately shiny, almost glabrous, piceous body. Part of the head and the sides of the pronotum are yellowish and the elytra are yellow with the sutural margin and two bands of spots piceous. The legs are reddish-brown and the antennal club is dark testaceous.
