= Agrilinellus abbonai =

Scientific classification
- Kingdom: Animalia
- Phylum: Arthropoda
- Clade: Pancrustacea
- Class: Insecta
- Order: Coleoptera
- Suborder: Polyphaga
- Infraorder: Scarabaeiformia
- Family: Scarabaeidae
- Genus: Agrilinellus
- Species: A. abbonai

Binomial name
- Agrilinellus abbonai Dellacasa, Dellacasa & Gordon, 2008

Species of beetle

Agrilinellus abbonai is a species of beetle of the family Scarabaeidae. It is found in Mexico (Michoacán).

== Description ==
Adults reach a length of about 5–5.5 mm (0.20–0.22 in). They have an oblong, convex, strongly shiny, glabrous, black body, with the tarsi and antennal club piceous.

== Etymology ==
The species is named in honour of the physician Prof. Carlo Abbona.
