= Agrilinellus nuriae =

Scientific classification
- Kingdom: Animalia
- Phylum: Arthropoda
- Clade: Pancrustacea
- Class: Insecta
- Order: Coleoptera
- Suborder: Polyphaga
- Infraorder: Scarabaeiformia
- Family: Scarabaeidae
- Genus: Agrilinellus
- Species: A. nuriae

Binomial name
- Agrilinellus nuriae Dellacasa, Dellacasa & Gordon, 2008

Species of beetle

Agrilinellus nuriae is a species of beetle of the family Scarabaeidae. It is found in Mexico (Nuevo León).

== Description ==
Adults reach a length of about 3–3.5 mm (0.12–0.14 in). They have an oblong, convex, shiny, almost glabrous, blackish body. The margin of the clypeus and anterior angles of the pronotum are reddish. The elytra are also reddish, but with the sutural margin brownish. The legs are brownish-red with paler tarsi and the antennal club is piceous.

== Life history ==
Specimens have been collected in cow dung.

== Etymology ==
The species is named in honour of the scarabaeidologist Dr. Nuria Trotta Moreu.
