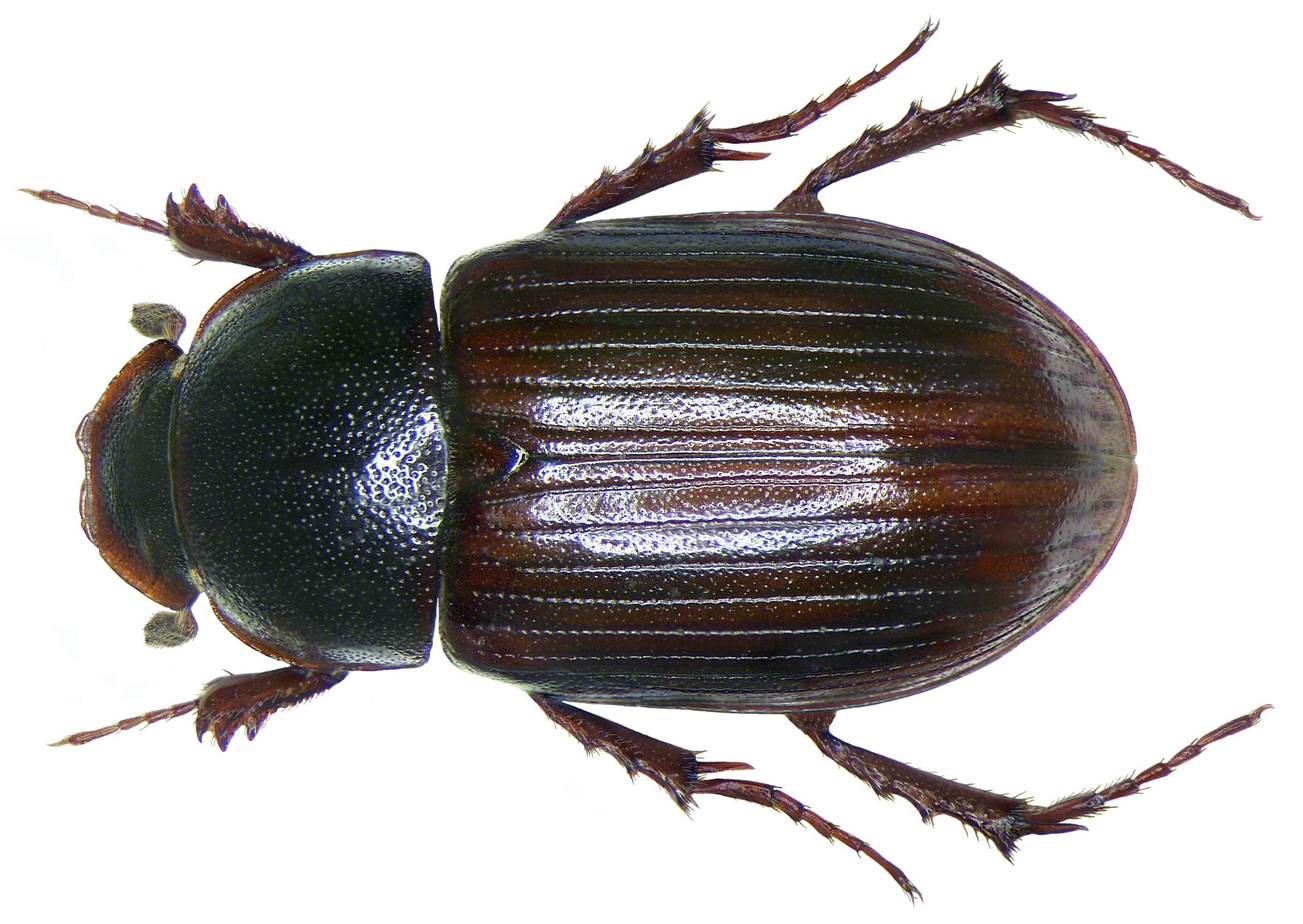

Scientific classification
- Kingdom: Animalia
- Phylum: Arthropoda
- Clade: Pancrustacea
- Class: Insecta
- Order: Coleoptera
- Suborder: Polyphaga
- Infraorder: Scarabaeiformia
- Family: Scarabaeidae
- Genus: Agolius
- Species: A. abdominalis

Binomial name
- Agolius abdominalis (Bonelli, 1812)

Synonyms
- Aphodius abdominalis Bonelli, 1812; Aphodius mixtus commaculatus Schmidt, 1917; Aphodius mixtus protectus Schmidt, 1917; Aphodius mixtus conjunctus Schilsky, 1888; Aphodius mixtus unicolor Schilsky, 1888; Aphodius bovinus Gistel, 1857; Aphodius chimarius Gistel, 1857; Aphodius oreophilus Gistel, 1857; Acrossus discus cyclocephalus Mulsant, 1842; Aphodius discus Schmidt, 1840; Aphodius discus Dejean, 1833; Aphodius mixtus Villa, 1833; Aphodius (Agolius) mixtus balazuci Nicolas, 1971; Aphodius (Agolius) abdominalis emilianus Dellacasa, 1983; Aphodius (Agolius) pecoudi Hoffmann, 1954

= Agolius abdominalis =

Species of beetle

Agolius abdominalis is a species of beetle of the family Scarabaeidae. It is found in Austria, France, Bosnia and Herzegovina, Croatia, Germany, Greece, Italy, Macedonia, Slovenia, Spain, Switzerland, the Czech Republic, Slovakia, Poland, Romania and Ukraine.

== Description ==
Adults reach a length of about 5–6 mm (0.20–0.24 in). They have an oblong, moderately convex, feebly shiny, glabrous, piceous body. The margin of the clypeus, sides of the pronotum and base and apex of the elytra are reddish, while the abdomen is testaceous.

== Subspecies ==
- Agolius abdominalis abdominalis (Austria, France, Bosnia and Herzegovina, Croatia, Germany, Greece, Italy, Macedonia, Slovenia, Spain, Switzerland)
- Agolius abdominalis balazuci (Nicolas, 1971) (France: Massif Central)
- Agolius abdominalis emilianus (Dellacasa, 1983) (Italy: Appennino Ligure, Tosco-Emiliano)
- Agolius abdominalis pecoudi (Hoffmann, 1954) (France: Hautes-Pyrénées, Andorra)
- Agolius abdominalis tatrensis Dellacasa & Dellacasa, 2005 (Slovakia, Czech Republic, Poland, Romania, Ukraine)
