= Agolius =

Scientific classification
- Kingdom: Animalia
- Phylum: Arthropoda
- Clade: Pancrustacea
- Class: Insecta
- Order: Coleoptera
- Suborder: Polyphaga
- Infraorder: Scarabaeiformia
- Family: Scarabaeidae
- Subfamily: Aphodiinae
- Tribe: Aphodiini
- Genus: Agolius; Mulsant & Rey, 1870

Synonyms
- Aphodius (Agolius) Mulsant & Rey, 1870; Aphodius (Calaphodius) Reitter, 1892

Genus of beetles

Agolius is a genus of beetles of the family Scarabaeidae.

== Species ==
- Agolius abdominalis (Bonelli, 1812)
- Agolius bonvouloiri (Harold, 1860)
