= Agolius bonvouloiri =

Scientific classification
- Kingdom: Animalia
- Phylum: Arthropoda
- Clade: Pancrustacea
- Class: Insecta
- Order: Coleoptera
- Suborder: Polyphaga
- Infraorder: Scarabaeiformia
- Family: Scarabaeidae
- Genus: Agolius
- Species: A. bonvouloiri

Binomial name
- Agolius bonvouloiri (Harold, 1860)

Synonyms
- Aphodius bonvouloiri Harold, 1860; Aphodius (Agolius) bonvouloiri biconnatus Dellacasa, 1983; Aphodius (Agolius) bonvouloiri damnatus Dellacasa, 1983; Aphodius (Agolius) bonvouloiri latemaculatus Dellacasa, 1983; Aphodius (Agolius) bonvouloiri marmoratus Dellacasa, 1983; Aphodius (Calaphodius) bonvouloiri satanas Baraud, 1975; Aphodius blanchei Chevrolat; Aphodius (Agolius) bonvouloiri cantabricus Pittino, 1981

Species of beetle

Agolius bonvouloiri is a species of beetle of the family Scarabaeidae. It is found in Portugal and Spain.

== Description ==
Adults reach a length of about 7–9 mm (0.28–0.35 in). They have a rather flatly convex, shiny, glabrous, black body, with the front of the head and the sides of the pronotum yellowish-brown. The elytra are also yellowish-brown, but with blackish-brown spots.

== Subspecies ==
- Agolius bonvouloiri bonvouloiri (Portugal, Spain)
- Agolius bonvouloiri cantabricus (Pittino, 1981) (Spain)
