= Aphodaulacus variabilis =

Scientific classification
- Kingdom: Animalia
- Phylum: Arthropoda
- Clade: Pancrustacea
- Class: Insecta
- Order: Coleoptera
- Suborder: Polyphaga
- Infraorder: Scarabaeiformia
- Family: Scarabaeidae
- Genus: Aphodaulacus
- Species: A. variabilis

Binomial name
- Aphodaulacus variabilis (Waterhouse, 1875)

Synonyms
- Aphodius variabilis Waterhouse, 1875

Species of beetle

Aphodaulacus variabilis is a species of beetle of the family Scarabaeidae. It is found in China (Liaoning, Nei Mongol), Japan, Korea, the Russian Far East and Siberia.

== Description ==
Adults reach a length of about 6–6.5 mm (0.24–0.26 in). They have a shiny, black body, the head and thorax with light brown sides. The elytra are yellowish-brown with a black pattern.

== Taxonomy ==
It was long treated as a synonym of Aphodaulacus nigrotessellatus.
