= Aphodaulacus koltzei =

Scientific classification
- Kingdom: Animalia
- Phylum: Arthropoda
- Clade: Pancrustacea
- Class: Insecta
- Order: Coleoptera
- Suborder: Polyphaga
- Infraorder: Scarabaeiformia
- Family: Scarabaeidae
- Genus: Aphodaulacus
- Species: A. koltzei

Binomial name
- Aphodaulacus koltzei (Reitter, 1892)

Synonyms
- Aphodius (Calaphodius) koltzei Reitter, 1892; Aphodius (Volinus) kurenzovi Nikritin, 1969; Aphodius (Volinus) medvedevi Nikritin, 1969

Species of beetle

Aphodaulacus koltzei is a species of beetle of the family Scarabaeidae. It is found in China (Jilin), the Russian Far East and Siberia.

== Description ==
Adults reach a length of about 4.5–5.5 mm (0.18–0.22 in). They have a rather strongly convex, glossy body. The head and pronotum are blackish-brown with yellowish margins. Furthermore, the base of the pronotum is edged with yellow along the sides. The elytra are yellowish-brown with dark brown spots and a preapical transverse band composed of spots. The legs are light yellowish-brown and the underside is covered with long hairs.
