= Aphodaulacus turkestanicus =

Scientific classification
- Kingdom: Animalia
- Phylum: Arthropoda
- Clade: Pancrustacea
- Class: Insecta
- Order: Coleoptera
- Suborder: Polyphaga
- Infraorder: Scarabaeiformia
- Family: Scarabaeidae
- Genus: Aphodaulacus
- Species: A. turkestanicus

Binomial name
- Aphodaulacus turkestanicus (Heyden, 1881)

Synonyms
- Aphodius turkestanicus Heyden, 1881; Aphodius (Aphodaulacus) stomachosus Balthasar, 1970; Aphodius (Melinopterus) bolassogloi Koenig, 1889

Species of beetle

Aphodaulacus turkestanicus is a species of beetle of the family Scarabaeidae. It is found in Afghanistan, China (Xinjiang), Kazakhstan, Turkmenistan and Uzbekistan.

== Description ==
Adults reach a length of about 5–8 mm (0.20–0.31 in). They have an elongate-oval, moderately convex, more or less shiny, blackish body. The head and pronotum are glabrous, while the elytra are diffusedly pubescent. The lateral margins of the pronotum are yellowish, the elytra brown-yellowish, and usually have several blackish spots.
