= Aphodaulacus perblandus =

Scientific classification
- Kingdom: Animalia
- Phylum: Arthropoda
- Clade: Pancrustacea
- Class: Insecta
- Order: Coleoptera
- Suborder: Polyphaga
- Infraorder: Scarabaeiformia
- Family: Scarabaeidae
- Genus: Aphodaulacus
- Species: A. perblandus

Binomial name
- Aphodaulacus perblandus (Balthasar, 1932)

Synonyms
- Aphodius (Aphodaulacus) perblandus Balthasar, 1932

Species of beetle

Aphodaulacus perblandus is a species of beetle of the family Scarabaeidae. It is found in China (Sichuan).

== Description ==
Adults reach a length of about 3.5–5 mm (0.14–0.20 in). They have a moderately glossy, light yellowish-brown body. Part of the head, a large and small spot on the disc of the pronotum, and several spots on the elytra are either lighter or darker brown. The legs are light yellowish-red.
