= Aphodaulacus =

Scientific classification
- Kingdom: Animalia
- Phylum: Arthropoda
- Clade: Pancrustacea
- Class: Insecta
- Order: Coleoptera
- Suborder: Polyphaga
- Infraorder: Scarabaeiformia
- Family: Scarabaeidae
- Subfamily: Aphodiinae
- Tribe: Aphodiini
- Genus: Aphodaulacus; Koshantschikov, 1911

Synonyms
- Aphodius (Aphodaulacus) Koshantschikov, 1911

Genus of beetles

Aphodaulacus is a genus of beetles of the family Scarabaeidae.

== Species ==
- Aphodaulacus assyricus (Petrovitz, 1971)
- Aphodaulacus balachanicola (Balthasar, 1973)
- Aphodaulacus grumi (Frolov, 2002)
- Aphodaulacus ignobilis (Reitter, 1887)
- Aphodaulacus kabaki (Frolov, 2001)
- Aphodaulacus kizeritskyi (Frolov, 2002)
- Aphodaulacus koltzei (Reitter, 1892)
- Aphodaulacus nigrotessellatus (Motschulsky, 1866)
- Aphodaulacus perblandus (Balthasar, 1932)
- Aphodaulacus saraevi (Nikolajev, 2004)
- Aphodaulacus turkestanicus (Heyden, 1881)
- Aphodaulacus variabilis (Waterhouse, 1875)
