= Aphodaulacus ignobilis =

Scientific classification
- Kingdom: Animalia
- Phylum: Arthropoda
- Clade: Pancrustacea
- Class: Insecta
- Order: Coleoptera
- Suborder: Polyphaga
- Infraorder: Scarabaeiformia
- Family: Scarabaeidae
- Genus: Aphodaulacus
- Species: A. ignobilis

Binomial name
- Aphodaulacus ignobilis (Reitter, 1887)

Synonyms
- Aphodius (Melinopterus) ignobilis Reitter, 1887; Aphodius (Volinus) forsteri Reitter, 1900

Species of beetle

Aphodaulacus ignobilis is a species of beetle of the family Scarabaeidae. It is found in China (Xizang), Kazakhstan and Turkmenistan.

== Description ==
Adults reach a length of about 6–9 mm (0.24–0.35 in). They are black, with the sides of the pronotum light brown and the elytra yellowish-brown with dark brown spots. The legs are yellowish-brown and the underside is brownish-black and mostly covered with long hairs.
