= Aphodaulacus nigrotessellatus =

Scientific classification
- Kingdom: Animalia
- Phylum: Arthropoda
- Clade: Pancrustacea
- Class: Insecta
- Order: Coleoptera
- Suborder: Polyphaga
- Infraorder: Scarabaeiformia
- Family: Scarabaeidae
- Genus: Aphodaulacus
- Species: A. nigrotessellatus

Binomial name
- Aphodaulacus nigrotessellatus (Motschulsky, 1866)

Synonyms
- Melinopterus nigrotessellatus Motschulsky, 1866; Aphodius (Calaphodius) ignobilis Heyden, 1893; Aphodius (Calaphodius) fundator Reitter, 1892; Aphodius obsoleteguttatus Waterhouse, 1875

Species of beetle

Aphodaulacus nigrotessellatus is a species of beetle of the family Scarabaeidae. It is found in China (Beijing, Fujian, Jilin, Liaoning, Nei Mongol, Xinjiang, Xizang), Japan, Korea, the Russian Far East and Siberia.

== Description ==
Adults reach a length of about 6–6.5 mm (0.24–0.26 in). They are shiny, blackish-brown, with the margins of the head and pronotum light brown. The elytra are yellowish-brown, shaded with blackish-brown with various spots. The legs are light brown and the antennae are dark.

== Life history ==
Specimens have been collected from human, dog and cow dung, as well as from bird droppings.
