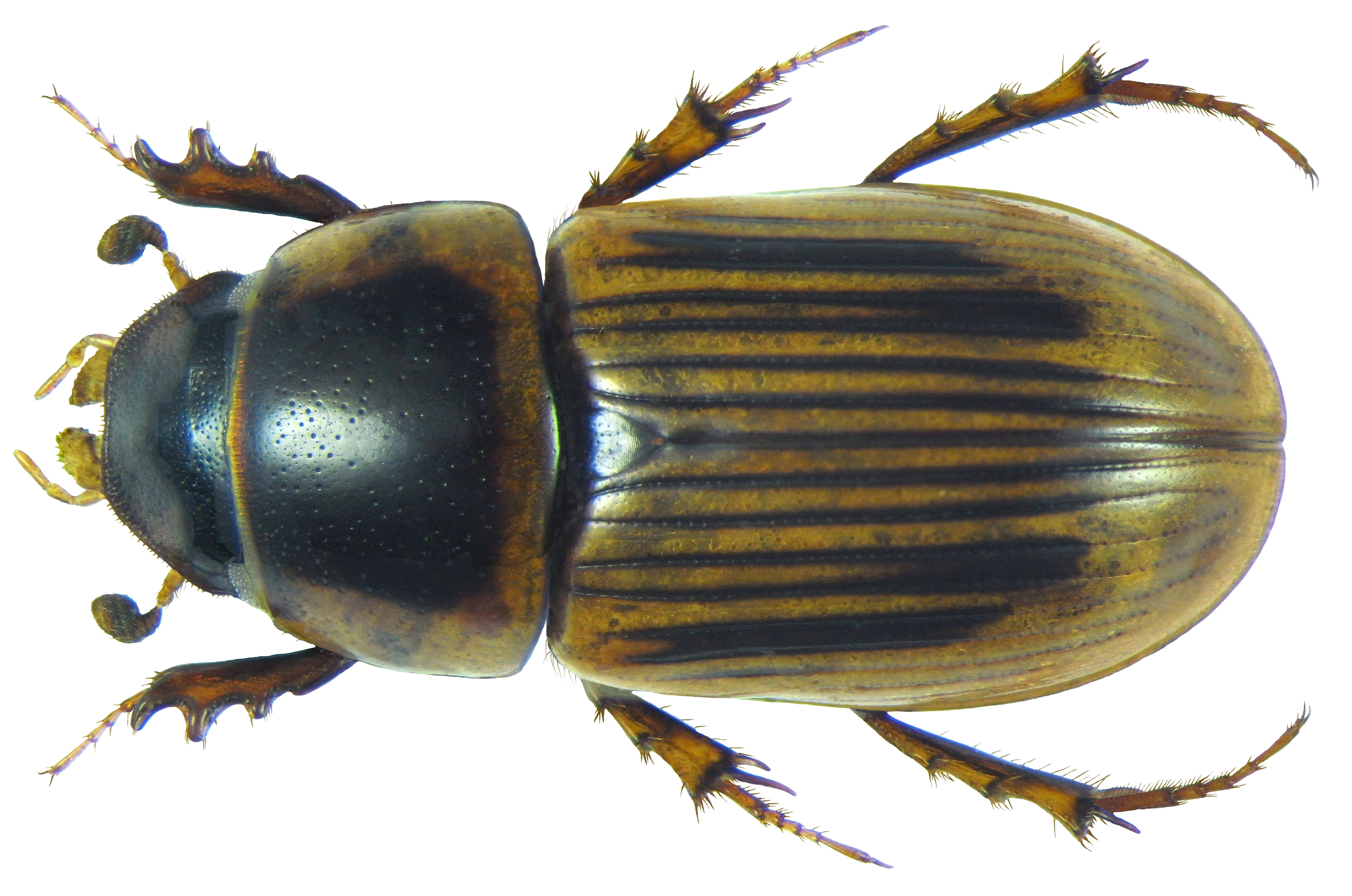

Scientific classification
- Kingdom: Animalia
- Phylum: Arthropoda
- Clade: Pancrustacea
- Class: Insecta
- Order: Coleoptera
- Suborder: Polyphaga
- Infraorder: Scarabaeiformia
- Family: Scarabaeidae
- Subfamily: Aphodiinae
- Tribe: Aphodiini
- Subtribe: Aphodiina
- Genus: Neocalaphodius
- Species: N. moestus

Binomial name
- Neocalaphodius moestus (Fabricius, 1801)

Synonyms
- Aphodius moestus Fabricius, 1801; Neocalaphodius moestus Král and Bezděk, 2016; Aphodius (Calaphodius) moestus connectens Endrödi, 1960; Aphodius (Calaphodius) moestus innotatus Endrödi, 1960; Aphodius subvittatus Fairmaire, 1896; Aphodius madagascariensis Harold, 1859; Aphodius mutans Walker, 1858

= Neocalaphodius moestus =

Species of beetle

Neocalaphodius moestus, is a species of dung beetle found throughout the countries in Afrotropical, Palaearctic and Indian subcontinent.

== Distribution ==
The species is common in many Afro-Asian tropical countries: India: Andaman and Nicobar islands, Afghanistan, Bhutan, Cambodia, Ethiopia, Iraq, Ivory Coast, Kenya, Laos, Madagascar, Mascarene Islands, Myanmar, Namibia, Nepal, Pakistan, Rwanda, Seychelles, Sri Lanka, Sudan, South Africa, Thailand, Turkey, Taiwan, and Tajikistan.

== Biology ==
After adult female lays eggs, it is followed by three instar larval stages and completes holometabolic development. Then this third instar constructs a pupation chamber with dung excrement. Then it pupates inside the pupation chamber which is oblong in shape. The life cycle from eggs to adult is about 40 to 45 days. Adult beetles are generally feed on liquid portion of the dung in which they later make tunnels inside the semi liquid. In 1973, Yadav recorded a diploid number of 22 chromosomes from the species, with a meiotic formula of 10 bivalents plus Xyp. But in 1993 research conducted by Yadav again recorded a diploid number of 20, 9 bivalents plus Xy from the species.

=== Egg ===
Eggs are creamy white in color with oblong shape. The length of an egg is about 1.39 mm and 0.79 mm in width. Female lays eggs singly on the drier portion of feces.

=== Larva ===
Third instar has characteristic C-shaped body. Abdomen transparent and thorax white in color. Head, and clypeus are light brown where the mandibles are dark brown to black. The four Antennal segments comprised with brown patches. Mandibles are dark brown and triangular, with black edges. In the abdomen, there is a prominent slit on the ventral anal lobe. Larvae generally feed on coarse dung.

=== Pupa ===
Exarate pupa is glabrous and the average length is about 2.32 mm. It is off white in color. Pupal support projections are absent. Male and female pupa are clearly distinguished due to male pupa having a cylindrical projection ‘gonopore’ on the last ventral sternite, which is absent in female pupa.

=== Adult ===
Adults are shiny and yellowish in color with an average body length of 5 to 7 mm. Epistome and pronotal disc are brownish black. Clypeus truncate anteriorly. Head and pronotum consist with double puncturations. Elytra with sparse yellowish bristles and flat interstices.
