= Neocalaphodius =

Scientific classification
- Kingdom: Animalia
- Phylum: Arthropoda
- Clade: Pancrustacea
- Class: Insecta
- Order: Coleoptera
- Suborder: Polyphaga
- Infraorder: Scarabaeiformia
- Family: Scarabaeidae
- Subfamily: Aphodiinae
- Tribe: Aphodiini
- Subtribe: Aphodiina
- Genus: Neocalaphodius; Bordat, 1990

Synonyms
- Aphodius (Neocalaphodius) Bordat, 1990

Genus of beetles

Neocalaphodius is a genus of lamellicorn beetles in the family Scarabaeidae. There are at least two described species in Neocalaphodius.

== Species ==
These two species belong to the genus Neocalaphodius:

- Neocalaphodius karolinae Minkina, 2015 (Malaysia)
- Neocalaphodius moestus (Fabricius, 1801) (Africa, Asia)
