= Loboparius hazarae =

Scientific classification
- Kingdom: Animalia
- Phylum: Arthropoda
- Clade: Pancrustacea
- Class: Insecta
- Order: Coleoptera
- Suborder: Polyphaga
- Infraorder: Scarabaeiformia
- Family: Scarabaeidae
- Genus: Loboparius
- Species: L. hazarae

Binomial name
- Loboparius hazarae (Stebnicka, 1985)

Synonyms
- Aphodius (Loboparius) hazarae Stebnicka, 1985

Species of beetle

Loboparius hazarae is a species of beetle of the family Scarabaeidae. It is found in Pakistan.

== Description ==
Adults reach a length of about 4.9 mm (0.19 in). They have a thick, strongly convex, short, moderately shining body. The head and pronotum are piceous, while the elytra and legs are dark reddish-brown.
