= Loboparius semiglobulus =

Scientific classification
- Kingdom: Animalia
- Phylum: Arthropoda
- Clade: Pancrustacea
- Class: Insecta
- Order: Coleoptera
- Suborder: Polyphaga
- Infraorder: Scarabaeiformia
- Family: Scarabaeidae
- Genus: Loboparius
- Species: L. semiglobulus

Binomial name
- Loboparius semiglobulus (Petrovitz, 1962)

Synonyms
- Aphodius (Loboparius) semiglobulus Petrovitz, 1962; Aphodius sexdentatus Dejean, 1833

Species of beetle

Loboparius semiglobulus is a species of beetle of the family Scarabaeidae. It is found in the Philippines (Luzon).

== Description ==
Adults reach a length of about 4–4.2 mm (0.16–0.17 in). They have a short, broad, glossy body. The head and pronotum are black, while the scutellum and elytra are reddish-brown, the latter with darkened striae. The antennae are blackish, the legs are reddish, and the underside is dark brown.
