= Loboparius scheibei =

Scientific classification
- Kingdom: Animalia
- Phylum: Arthropoda
- Clade: Pancrustacea
- Class: Insecta
- Order: Coleoptera
- Suborder: Polyphaga
- Infraorder: Scarabaeiformia
- Family: Scarabaeidae
- Genus: Loboparius
- Species: L. scheibei

Binomial name
- Loboparius scheibei (Balthasar, 1955)

Synonyms
- Aphodius (Loboparius) scheibei Balthasar, 1955

Species of beetle

Loboparius scheibei is a species of beetle of the family Scarabaeidae. It is found in Afghanistan, India (Sikkim, Rajasthan), Nepal and Pakistan.

== Description ==
Adults reach a length of about 4–5.5 mm (0.16–0.22 in). They have a short-oval, robust, strongly convex, glossy, black body. The tip of the elytra is slightly reddish and translucent, and has a few short, pale hairs. The legs are reddish-brown and the antennal club is yellowish-brown.
