= Loboparius mirificus =

Scientific classification
- Kingdom: Animalia
- Phylum: Arthropoda
- Clade: Pancrustacea
- Class: Insecta
- Order: Coleoptera
- Suborder: Polyphaga
- Infraorder: Scarabaeiformia
- Family: Scarabaeidae
- Genus: Loboparius
- Species: L. mirificus

Binomial name
- Loboparius mirificus (Balthasar, 1932)

Synonyms
- Aphodius (Loboparius) mirificus Balthasar, 1932

Species of beetle

Loboparius mirificus is a species of beetle of the family Scarabaeidae. It is found in China (Yunnan), Nepal, India (Himachal Pradesh, Sikkim), Laos, Myanmar and Vietnam.

== Description ==
Adults reach a length of about 6–6.5 mm (0.24–0.26 in). They have a broad, convex, glossy, glabrous, black body. The lateral margins of the elytra are yellowish-red and the antennal club is yellowish.
