= Loboparius globulus =

Scientific classification
- Kingdom: Animalia
- Phylum: Arthropoda
- Clade: Pancrustacea
- Class: Insecta
- Order: Coleoptera
- Suborder: Polyphaga
- Infraorder: Scarabaeiformia
- Family: Scarabaeidae
- Genus: Loboparius
- Species: L. globulus

Binomial name
- Loboparius globulus (Harold, 1859)

Synonyms
- Aphodius globulus Harold, 1859; Aphodius (Loboparius) globulus flavidulus Dellacasa, 1983; Aphodius (Loboparius) globulus mantschouricus Dellacasa, 1983; Aphodius (Loboparius) globulus perpunctatus Paulian, 1934; Aphodius globulus bisectus Waterhouse, 1875

Species of beetle

Loboparius globulus is a species of beetle of the family Scarabaeidae. It is found in China (Fujian, Guangdong, Guizhou, Guangxi, Hainan, Hong Kong, Yunnan), Japan, Taiwan and Vietnam.

== Description ==
Adults reach a length of about 4–5 mm (0.16–0.20 in). They have a short, strongly convex, nearly dull, brownish body. The elytra are sometimes blackish or even brown-yellowish.
