= Loboparius =

Scientific classification
- Kingdom: Animalia
- Phylum: Arthropoda
- Clade: Pancrustacea
- Class: Insecta
- Order: Coleoptera
- Suborder: Polyphaga
- Infraorder: Scarabaeiformia
- Family: Scarabaeidae
- Subfamily: Aphodiinae
- Tribe: Aphodiini
- Genus: Loboparius; Schmidt, 1914

Synonyms
- Aphodius (Loboparius) Schmidt, 1914

Genus of beetles

Loboparius is a genus of beetles of the family Scarabaeidae.

== Species ==
- Loboparius auriculatus (Schmidt, 1908)
- Loboparius chaiyaphumi (Emberson & Stebnicka, 2001)
- Loboparius choparti Paulian, 1945
- Loboparius drumonti (Rakovič & Mencl, 2010)
- Loboparius dunchensis (Stebnicka, 1982)
- Loboparius globulus (Harold, 1859)
- Loboparius hazarae (Stebnicka, 1985)
- Loboparius immarginatus (Schmidt, 1907)
- Loboparius joannae (Dellacasa, 1982)
- Loboparius kotoensis (Miwa, 1930)
- Loboparius mirificus (Balthasar, 1932)
- Loboparius nathani (Johnson, 1978)
- Loboparius punctatissimus (Boucomont, 1921)
- Loboparius scheibei (Balthasar, 1955)
- Loboparius schereri (Petrovitz, 1963)
- Loboparius semiglobulus (Petrovitz, 1962)
