= Loboparius punctatissimus =

Scientific classification
- Kingdom: Animalia
- Phylum: Arthropoda
- Clade: Pancrustacea
- Class: Insecta
- Order: Coleoptera
- Suborder: Polyphaga
- Infraorder: Scarabaeiformia
- Family: Scarabaeidae
- Genus: Loboparius
- Species: L. punctatissimus

Binomial name
- Loboparius punctatissimus (Boucomont, 1921)

Synonyms
- Aphodius (Loboparius) punctatissimus Boucomont, 1921

Species of beetle

Loboparius punctatissimus is a species of beetle of the family Scarabaeidae. It is found in Laos and Thailand.

== Description ==
Adults reach a length of about 5–5.5 mm (0.20–0.22 in). They have a very convex, short, broad, dull, black body, the elytra with sparse, short, erect, pale pubescence.
