= Loboparius choparti =

Scientific classification
- Kingdom: Animalia
- Phylum: Arthropoda
- Clade: Pancrustacea
- Class: Insecta
- Order: Coleoptera
- Suborder: Polyphaga
- Infraorder: Scarabaeiformia
- Family: Scarabaeidae
- Genus: Loboparius
- Species: L. choparti

Binomial name
- Loboparius choparti Paulian, 1945

Species of beetle

Loboparius choparti is a species of beetle of the family Scarabaeidae. It is found in Vietnam.

== Description ==
Adults reach a length of about 4.5 mm (0.18 in). They have a strongly convex, short-oval, glossy body. The elytra are reddish-brown, with some short pale hairs in the apical region. The head and pronotum are black.
