= Parammoecius pyrenaeus =

Scientific classification
- Kingdom: Animalia
- Phylum: Arthropoda
- Clade: Pancrustacea
- Class: Insecta
- Order: Coleoptera
- Suborder: Polyphaga
- Infraorder: Scarabaeiformia
- Family: Scarabaeidae
- Genus: Parammoecius
- Species: P. pyrenaeus

Binomial name
- Parammoecius pyrenaeus (Jacquelin du Val, 1859)

Synonyms
- Ammoecius pyrenaeus Jacquelin du Val, 1859; Aphodius (Agoliinus) davidi Hoffmann, 1954; Aphodius intactus Schmidt, 1917; Aphodius (Orodalus) reitterianus Schwarz, 1897; Ammoecius rugiceps Mulsant & Rey, 1870; Aphodius jugicola Harold, 1863; Aphodius monticola Mulsant, 1842; Aphodius monticola Dejean, 1833

Species of beetle

Parammoecius pyrenaeus is a species of beetle of the family Scarabaeidae. It is found in France (Alps, Pyrenees) and Switzerland.

== Description ==
Adults reach a length of about 4.5–5 mm (0.18–0.20 in). They have an elongate-oval, rather strongly convex, glabrous, black body, with the outer margin of the head and the apex of the elytra reddish-brown. The legs are brown.
