= Parammoecius gibbus =

Scientific classification
- Kingdom: Animalia
- Phylum: Arthropoda
- Clade: Pancrustacea
- Class: Insecta
- Order: Coleoptera
- Suborder: Polyphaga
- Infraorder: Scarabaeiformia
- Family: Scarabaeidae
- Genus: Parammoecius
- Species: P. gibbus

Binomial name
- Parammoecius gibbus (Germar, 1816)

Synonyms
- Aphodius gibbus Germar, 1816; Ammoecius transsylvanicus Küster, 1849; Aphodius anthracinus Schmidt, 1840

Species of beetle

Parammoecius gibbus is a species of beetle of the family Scarabaeidae. It is found in Austria, Bosnia and Herzegovina, the Czech Republic, France, Germany, Italy, Latvia, Poland, Romania, Russia, Slovakia, Switzerland and Ukraine.

== Description ==
Adults reach a length of about 4–4.5 mm (0.16–0.18 in). They have a feebly elongate, convex, glabrous body, with the head and pronotum somewhat shiny and the elytra dull. They are blackish, with the margin of the clypeus and lateral margins of the pronotum reddish. The antennae are brownish with a blackish club and the legs are dark brown-reddish.
