= Parammoecius asphaltinus =

Scientific classification
- Kingdom: Animalia
- Phylum: Arthropoda
- Clade: Pancrustacea
- Class: Insecta
- Order: Coleoptera
- Suborder: Polyphaga
- Infraorder: Scarabaeiformia
- Family: Scarabaeidae
- Genus: Parammoecius
- Species: P. asphaltinus

Binomial name
- Parammoecius asphaltinus (Kolenati, 1846)

Synonyms
- Aphodius asphaltinus Kolenati, 1846; Aphodius (Agrilinus) ater falsarius Reitter, 1892

Species of beetle

Parammoecius asphaltinus is a species of beetle of the family Scarabaeidae. It is found in Armenia, Georgia, Russia and Turkey.

== Description ==
Adults reach a length of about 5–6 mm (0.20–0.24 in). They are entirely black, with the tips of the elytra reddish.
