= Parammoecius yamato =

Scientific classification
- Kingdom: Animalia
- Phylum: Arthropoda
- Clade: Pancrustacea
- Class: Insecta
- Order: Coleoptera
- Suborder: Polyphaga
- Infraorder: Scarabaeiformia
- Family: Scarabaeidae
- Genus: Parammoecius
- Species: P. yamato

Binomial name
- Parammoecius yamato (Nakane, 1960)

Synonyms
- Aphodius (Parammoecius) yamato Nakane, 1960

Species of beetle

Parammoecius yamato is a species of beetle of the family Scarabaeidae. It is found in Japan.

== Description ==
Adults reach a length of about 3.7–4 mm (0.15–0.16 in). They have a broad, stout, strongly convex, glossy, black body, with the sides of the head, the front and lateral margins of the pronotum and the legs reddish-brown.
