= Parammoecius =

Scientific classification
- Kingdom: Animalia
- Phylum: Arthropoda
- Clade: Pancrustacea
- Class: Insecta
- Order: Coleoptera
- Suborder: Polyphaga
- Infraorder: Scarabaeiformia
- Family: Scarabaeidae
- Subfamily: Aphodiinae
- Tribe: Aphodiini
- Genus: Parammoecius; Seidlitz, 1888

Synonyms
- Aphodius (Parammoecius) Seidlitz, 1888

Genus of beetles

Parammoecius is a genus of beetles of the family Scarabaeidae.

== Species ==
- Parammoecius amanicus (Stebnicka, 1978)
- Parammoecius asphaltinus (Kolenati, 1846)
- Parammoecius brevithorax (Sumakov, 1903)
- Parammoecius corvinus (Erichson, 1848)
- Parammoecius gibbus (Germar, 1816)
- Parammoecius pyrenaeus (Jacquelin du Val, 1859)
- Parammoecius yamato (Nakane, 1960)
