= Parammoecius brevithorax =

Scientific classification
- Kingdom: Animalia
- Phylum: Arthropoda
- Clade: Pancrustacea
- Class: Insecta
- Order: Coleoptera
- Suborder: Polyphaga
- Infraorder: Scarabaeiformia
- Family: Scarabaeidae
- Genus: Parammoecius
- Species: P. brevithorax

Binomial name
- Parammoecius brevithorax (Sumakov, 1903)

Synonyms
- Aphodius (Amidorus) brevithorax Sumakov, 1903; Aphodius (Parammoecius) interfinius Ziani, 1999; Aphodius osseticus Iablokoff-Khnzorian, 1972

Species of beetle

Parammoecius brevithorax is a species of beetle of the family Scarabaeidae. It is found in Georgia, Russia and Turkey.

== Description ==
Adults reach a length of about 7 mm (0.28 in). They have a shiny, glabrous, black body. with the tips of the elytra slightly reddish and translucent. The last abdominal segment and the tarsi are reddish.
