= Parammoecius corvinus =

Scientific classification
- Kingdom: Animalia
- Phylum: Arthropoda
- Clade: Pancrustacea
- Class: Insecta
- Order: Coleoptera
- Suborder: Polyphaga
- Infraorder: Scarabaeiformia
- Family: Scarabaeidae
- Genus: Parammoecius
- Species: P. corvinus

Binomial name
- Parammoecius corvinus (Erichson, 1848)

Synonyms
- Aphodius corvinus Erichson, 1848; Aphodius corvinus rufipennis Schmidt, 1938; Aphodius subterraneus totarufa Schmidt, 1938; Aphodius zenkeri marchicus Scholz, 1935; Aphodius vertumnus Gistel, 1857

Species of beetle

Parammoecius corvinus is a species of beetle of the family Scarabaeidae. It is found in Austria, Belarus, Belgium, Bosnia Herzegovina, Bulgaria, Croatia, the Czech Republic, France, Germany, Hungary, Italy, the Netherlands, Poland, Romania, Russia, Slovakia, Slovenia, Spain, Switzerland and Ukraine.

== Description ==
Adults reach a length of about 3–4 mm (0.12–0.16 in). They have a strongly convex, rather short-oval, highly glossy, glabrous, black or blackish-brown body, sometimes with the elytra reddish-brown. The legs are yellowish-brown.
