= Paulianellus neomaderi =

Scientific classification
- Kingdom: Animalia
- Phylum: Arthropoda
- Clade: Pancrustacea
- Class: Insecta
- Order: Coleoptera
- Suborder: Polyphaga
- Infraorder: Scarabaeiformia
- Family: Scarabaeidae
- Genus: Paulianellus
- Species: P. neomaderi

Binomial name
- Paulianellus neomaderi Mencl, Král & Rakovič, 2015

Species of beetle

Paulianellus neomaderi is a species of beetle of the family Scarabaeidae. It is found in China (Gansu, Shaanxi, Sichuan, Yunnan).

== Description ==
Adults reach a length of about 4.8–7.4 mm (0.19–0.29 in). They have an oblong-oval, moderately convex, glabrous, shining, dark brown to blackish-brown body, with the lateral margins of the clypeus usually reddish-brown. The legs and antennae are brown.

== Life history ==
Specimens have been collected in horse dung.

== Etymology ==
The species name is refers to its similarity to Paulianellus maderi.
