= Paulianellus laoticus =

Scientific classification
- Kingdom: Animalia
- Phylum: Arthropoda
- Clade: Pancrustacea
- Class: Insecta
- Order: Coleoptera
- Suborder: Polyphaga
- Infraorder: Scarabaeiformia
- Family: Scarabaeidae
- Genus: Paulianellus
- Species: P. laoticus

Binomial name
- Paulianellus laoticus Mencl, Král & Rakovič, 2015

Species of beetle

Paulianellus laoticus is a species of beetle of the family Scarabaeidae. It is found in Laos and Thailand.

== Description ==
Adults reach a length of about 5.5–7.2 mm (0.22–0.28 in). They have an oblong-oval, moderately convex, glabrous, shining, blackish-brown or almost black body. The forebody is sometimes darker than the elytra and the margins of the clypeus are usually brown, while the anterior margin of the pronotum is sometimes brown. The legs and antennae are brown.

== Life history ==
Specimens have been collected in cow dung.

== Etymology ==
The species name is derived from the name of the country where the holotype was collected.
