= Paulianellus =

Scientific classification
- Kingdom: Animalia
- Phylum: Arthropoda
- Clade: Pancrustacea
- Class: Insecta
- Order: Coleoptera
- Suborder: Polyphaga
- Infraorder: Scarabaeiformia
- Family: Scarabaeidae
- Subfamily: Aphodiinae
- Tribe: Aphodiini
- Genus: Paulianellus; Balthasar, 1938

Synonyms
- Aphodius (Paulianellus) Balthasar, 1938

Genus of beetles

Paulianellus is a genus of beetles of the family Scarabaeidae.

== Species ==
- Paulianellus andrei Minkina & Král, 2018
- Paulianellus asahinai (Nakane, 1951)
- Paulianellus decoctor (Balthasar, 1965)
- Paulianellus jacksoni (Petrovitz, 1975)
- Paulianellus khandui (Stebnicka, 1981)
- Paulianellus laoticus Mencl, Král & Rakovič, 2015
- Paulianellus maderi (Balthasar, 1938)
- Paulianellus mureensis (Stebnicka, 1981)
- Paulianellus neomaderi Mencl, Král & Rakovič, 2015
- Paulianellus nepalensis (Balthasar, 1965)
- Paulianellus taiwanensis Mencl, Král & Rakovič, 2015
