= Paulianellus mureensis =

Scientific classification
- Kingdom: Animalia
- Phylum: Arthropoda
- Clade: Pancrustacea
- Class: Insecta
- Order: Coleoptera
- Suborder: Polyphaga
- Infraorder: Scarabaeiformia
- Family: Scarabaeidae
- Genus: Paulianellus
- Species: P. mureensis

Binomial name
- Paulianellus mureensis (Stebnicka, 1981)

Synonyms
- Aphodius (Paulianellus) mureensis Stebnicka, 1981

Species of beetle

Paulianellus mureensis is a species of beetle of the family Scarabaeidae. It is found in Nepal and India (West Bengal).

== Description ==
Adults reach a length of about 6.1–7 mm (0.24–0.28 in). They have an oblong-oval, moderately convex, glabrous, shining, blackish-brown body, with the margins of the clypeus usually brown. The legs and antennae are brown.
