= Paulianellus asahinai =

Scientific classification
- Kingdom: Animalia
- Phylum: Arthropoda
- Clade: Pancrustacea
- Class: Insecta
- Order: Coleoptera
- Suborder: Polyphaga
- Infraorder: Scarabaeiformia
- Family: Scarabaeidae
- Genus: Paulianellus
- Species: P. asahinai

Binomial name
- Paulianellus asahinai (Nakane, 1951)

Synonyms
- Aphodius (Acrossus) asahinai Nakane, 1951; Aphodius (Acrossus) koreanensis Kim, 1986

Species of beetle

Paulianellus asahinai is a species of beetle of the family Scarabaeidae. It is found in Japan (Honshu, Kagoshima, Kyushu) and South Korea.

== Description ==
Adults reach a length of about 4.7–6.4 mm (0.19–0.25 in). They have an oblong-oval, moderately convex, glabrous, shining body. The colour ranges from reddish-brown or castaneous to dark brown, with the margins of the clypeus lighter.
