= Paulianellus taiwanensis =

Scientific classification
- Kingdom: Animalia
- Phylum: Arthropoda
- Clade: Pancrustacea
- Class: Insecta
- Order: Coleoptera
- Suborder: Polyphaga
- Infraorder: Scarabaeiformia
- Family: Scarabaeidae
- Genus: Paulianellus
- Species: P. taiwanensis

Binomial name
- Paulianellus taiwanensis Mencl, Král & Rakovič, 2015

Species of beetle

Paulianellus taiwanensis is a species of beetle of the family Scarabaeidae. It is found in Taiwan.

== Description ==
Adults reach a length of about 5.9–6.2 mm (0.23–0.24 in). They have an oblong-oval, moderately convex, glabrous, shining, brown to dark brown body, with the margins of the clypeus lighter. The legs and antennae are brown.

== Etymology ==
The species name is derived from the name of the country where the holotype was collected.
