= Paulianellus maderi =

Scientific classification
- Kingdom: Animalia
- Phylum: Arthropoda
- Clade: Pancrustacea
- Class: Insecta
- Order: Coleoptera
- Suborder: Polyphaga
- Infraorder: Scarabaeiformia
- Family: Scarabaeidae
- Genus: Paulianellus
- Species: P. maderi

Binomial name
- Paulianellus maderi (Balthasar, 1938)

Synonyms
- Aphodius (Paulianellus) maderi Balthasar, 1938; Aphodius (Acrossus) yulingensis Petrovitz, 1961

Species of beetle

Paulianellus maderi is a species of beetle of the family Scarabaeidae. It is found in China (Anhui, Shaanxi, Sichuan, Xizang, Yunnan) and Korea.

== Description ==
Adults reach a length of about 5–6.5 mm (0.20–0.26 in). They have an elongate, convex, strongly shiny, glabrous, piceous body, with the clypeus and lateral margins of the pronotum reddish, and sometimes even dark brown-reddish.
