= Didactylia pallicolor =

Scientific classification
- Kingdom: Animalia
- Phylum: Arthropoda
- Clade: Pancrustacea
- Class: Insecta
- Order: Coleoptera
- Suborder: Polyphaga
- Infraorder: Scarabaeiformia
- Family: Scarabaeidae
- Genus: Didactylia
- Species: D. pallicolor

Binomial name
- Didactylia pallicolor (Fairmaire, 1885)

Synonyms
- Aphodius pallicolor Fairmaire, 1885

Species of beetle

Didactylia pallicolor is a species of beetle of the family Scarabaeidae. It is found in Djibouti and Somalia.

== Description ==
Adults reach a length of about 3–4 mm (0.12–0.16 in). They have an elongate, feebly convex, sericeous, pale testaceous, glabrous body, although the elytra are pubescent laterally and apically.
