= Didactylia murati =

Scientific classification
- Kingdom: Animalia
- Phylum: Arthropoda
- Clade: Pancrustacea
- Class: Insecta
- Order: Coleoptera
- Suborder: Polyphaga
- Infraorder: Scarabaeiformia
- Family: Scarabaeidae
- Genus: Didactylia
- Species: D. murati

Binomial name
- Didactylia murati Paulian, 1939

Species of beetle

Didactylia murati is a species of beetle of the family Scarabaeidae. It is found in Mali, Mauretania, Niger and Senegal.

== Description ==
Adults reach a length of about 3–3.5 mm (0.12–0.14 in). They have a slightly glossy, moderately convex, parallel-sided, light to dark yellowish-brown body, with the middle of the head and the disc of the pronotum darker brown. The elytra have a darkened suture and a brown preapical spot.
