= Didactylia exsecta =

Scientific classification
- Kingdom: Animalia
- Phylum: Arthropoda
- Clade: Pancrustacea
- Class: Insecta
- Order: Coleoptera
- Suborder: Polyphaga
- Infraorder: Scarabaeiformia
- Family: Scarabaeidae
- Genus: Didactylia
- Species: D. exsecta

Binomial name
- Didactylia exsecta Schmidt, 1910

Species of beetle

Didactylia exsecta is a species of beetle of the family Scarabaeidae. It is found in Madagascar.

== Description ==
Adults reach a length of about 3.5 mm (0.14 in). They have an elongate, flat, light brown body, with the back of the head, the central part of the pronotum and the disc of the elytra with large dark spots, while smaller dark spots are present on the sides and in front of the apex.
