= Didactylia capitulata =

Scientific classification
- Kingdom: Animalia
- Phylum: Arthropoda
- Clade: Pancrustacea
- Class: Insecta
- Order: Coleoptera
- Suborder: Polyphaga
- Infraorder: Scarabaeiformia
- Family: Scarabaeidae
- Genus: Didactylia
- Species: D. capitulata

Binomial name
- Didactylia capitulata (Clouët, 1898)

Synonyms
- Aphodius capitulatus Clouët, 1898

Species of beetle

Didactylia capitulata is a species of beetle of the family Scarabaeidae. It is found in Algeria.

== Description ==
Adults reach a length of about 3.8 mm (0.15 in). They have an elongate, convex, light brown body, with the back of the head, the disc of the pronotum, the scutellum, and the elytral suture darker brown.
