= Didactylia clementi =

Scientific classification
- Kingdom: Animalia
- Phylum: Arthropoda
- Clade: Pancrustacea
- Class: Insecta
- Order: Coleoptera
- Suborder: Polyphaga
- Infraorder: Scarabaeiformia
- Family: Scarabaeidae
- Genus: Didactylia
- Species: D. clementi

Binomial name
- Didactylia clementi Peyerimhoff, 1929

Species of beetle

Didactylia clementi is a species of beetle of the family Scarabaeidae. It is found in Algeria, the Western Sahara, Chad and the Democratic Republic of the Congo.

== Description ==
Adults reach a length of about 3.8–4 mm (0.15–0.16 in). They have a slightly shiny, straw-yellow body, with a dark spot on each side of the pronotum. The elytral suture is darkened, while the sides and apex have some small hairs.
