= Didactylia =

Scientific classification
- Kingdom: Animalia
- Phylum: Arthropoda
- Clade: Pancrustacea
- Class: Insecta
- Order: Coleoptera
- Suborder: Polyphaga
- Infraorder: Scarabaeiformia
- Family: Scarabaeidae
- Subfamily: Aphodiinae
- Tribe: Aphodiini
- Genus: Didactylia; Orbigny, 1896

Synonyms
- Nataia Endrödi, 1961; Glaraphodius Balthasar, 1941

Genus of beetles

Didactylia is a genus of beetles of the family Scarabaeidae.

== Species ==
- Didactylia arabica Pittino, 1984
- Didactylia asbenica Villiers, 1950
- Didactylia binotata Müller, 1942
- Didactylia buxtoni Paulian, 1939
- Didactylia capitulata (Clouët, 1898)
- Didactylia castanea Petrovitz, 1973
- Didactylia cicatricosa Schmidt, 1908
- Didactylia clementi Peyerimhoff, 1929
- Didactylia exsecta Schmidt, 1910
- Didactylia gilva Petrovitz, 1973
- Didactylia gilvoides Endrödi, 1979
- Didactylia macarthuri Paulian, 1942
- Didactylia murati Paulian, 1939
- Didactylia pallicolor (Fairmaire, 1885)
- Didactylia picta Müller, 1942
- Didactylia pictipennis (Fairmaire, 1897)
- Didactylia pittinoi Bordat, 1986
- Didactylia puncticeps Paulian, 1942
- Didactylia pura Schmidt, 1914
- Didactylia rosickyi (Balthasar, 1963)
- Didactylia somalicus (Balthasar, 1941)
- Didactylia szunyoghyi (Endrödi, 1961)
- Didactylia tenuipunctata Bordat, 1988
- Didactylia turbida (Erichson, 1843)
- Didactylia varia Schmidt, 1908
- Didactylia volkonskyi Paulian, 1942
