= Didactylia volkonskyi =

Scientific classification
- Kingdom: Animalia
- Phylum: Arthropoda
- Clade: Pancrustacea
- Class: Insecta
- Order: Coleoptera
- Suborder: Polyphaga
- Infraorder: Scarabaeiformia
- Family: Scarabaeidae
- Genus: Didactylia
- Species: D. volkonskyi

Binomial name
- Didactylia volkonskyi Paulian, 1942

Species of beetle

Didactylia volkonskyi is a species of beetle of the family Scarabaeidae. It is found in the central Sahara and Mali.

== Description ==
Adults reach a length of about 3.2–3.5 mm (0.13–0.14 in). They have a elongate-parallel, slightly convex, dull body, the margins with rather long cilia. They are light yellowish-brown, with the back of the head, the disc of the pronotum, and the suture of the elytra darker brown.
