= Neotrichaphodioides caracanus =

Scientific classification
- Kingdom: Animalia
- Phylum: Arthropoda
- Clade: Pancrustacea
- Class: Insecta
- Order: Coleoptera
- Suborder: Polyphaga
- Infraorder: Scarabaeiformia
- Family: Scarabaeidae
- Genus: Neotrichaphodioides
- Species: N. caracanus

Binomial name
- Neotrichaphodioides caracanus (Balthasar, 1970)

Synonyms
- Aphodius (Gonaphodiellus) caracanus Balthasar, 1970; Aphodius (Gonaphodiellus) martinsi Petrovitz, 1970

Species of beetle

Neotrichaphodioides caracanus is a species of beetle of the family Scarabaeidae. It is found in Argentina, Bolivia, Brazil (Distrito Federal, Mato Grosso, Minas Gerais), Colombia and Venezuela.

== Description ==
Adults reach a length of about 3.5–4.5 mm (0.14–0.18 in). The body is light testaceous and the clypeus is weakly sinuate and rounded. The pronotum has punctures of two sizes and a weakly sinuate posterior margin. The elytra are lighter than the head and pronotum, with a darkened rounded spot and with the interstriae weakly convex.

== Life history ==
Specimens have been in Cerrado and agricultural areas at altitudes up to 1380 metres.
