= Neotrichaphodioides ecuadoriensis =

Scientific classification
- Kingdom: Animalia
- Phylum: Arthropoda
- Clade: Pancrustacea
- Class: Insecta
- Order: Coleoptera
- Suborder: Polyphaga
- Infraorder: Scarabaeiformia
- Family: Scarabaeidae
- Genus: Neotrichaphodioides
- Species: N. ecuadoriensis

Binomial name
- Neotrichaphodioides ecuadoriensis (Petrovitz, 1961)

Synonyms
- Aphodius (Trichaphodius) ecuadoriensis Petrovitz, 1961

Species of beetle

Neotrichaphodioides ecuadoriensis is a species of beetle of the family Scarabaeidae. It is found in Ecuador.

== Description ==
Adults reach a length of about 5–5.5 mm (0.20–0.22 in). They have an oblong, moderately convex, sub-shiny, glabrous, reddish-brown body, with the margin of the clypeus and the sides of the pronotum paler. The legs are reddish-brown and the antennal club is yellowish.
