= Neotrichaphodioides =

Scientific classification
- Kingdom: Animalia
- Phylum: Arthropoda
- Clade: Pancrustacea
- Class: Insecta
- Order: Coleoptera
- Suborder: Polyphaga
- Infraorder: Scarabaeiformia
- Family: Scarabaeidae
- Subfamily: Aphodiinae
- Tribe: Aphodiini
- Genus: Neotrichaphodioides; Dellacasa, Dellacasa & Skelley, 2010

Genus of beetles

Neotrichaphodioides is a genus of beetles of the family Scarabaeidae.

== Species ==
- Neotrichaphodioides caracanus (Balthasar, 1970)
- Neotrichaphodioides ecuadoriensis (Petrovitz, 1961)
- Neotrichaphodioides forsterianus (Balthasar, 1960)
- Neotrichaphodioides volxemi (Harold, 1876)
- Neotrichaphodioides woytkowskii Dellacasa, Dellacasa & Skelley, 2010
