= Neotrichaphodioides forsterianus =

Scientific classification
- Kingdom: Animalia
- Phylum: Arthropoda
- Clade: Pancrustacea
- Class: Insecta
- Order: Coleoptera
- Suborder: Polyphaga
- Infraorder: Scarabaeiformia
- Family: Scarabaeidae
- Genus: Neotrichaphodioides
- Species: N. forsterianus

Binomial name
- Neotrichaphodioides forsterianus (Balthasar, 1960)

Synonyms
- Aphodius forsterianus Balthasar, 1960

Species of beetle

Neotrichaphodioides forsterianus is a species of beetle of the family Scarabaeidae. It is found in Bolivia and Costa Rica.

== Description ==
Adults reach a length of about 5–6 mm (0.20–0.24 in). They have an oblong, moderately convex, shiny, glabrous, brown-reddish body. Part of the head, the sides of the pronotum and the elytra are reddish-testaceous, the latter with a paler spot surrounded by a piceous border. The legs are pale brown-reddish and the antennal club is brownish.
