= Neotrichaphodioides woytkowskii =

Scientific classification
- Kingdom: Animalia
- Phylum: Arthropoda
- Clade: Pancrustacea
- Class: Insecta
- Order: Coleoptera
- Suborder: Polyphaga
- Infraorder: Scarabaeiformia
- Family: Scarabaeidae
- Genus: Neotrichaphodioides
- Species: N. woytkowskii

Binomial name
- Neotrichaphodioides woytkowskii Dellacasa, Dellacasa & Skelley, 2010

Species of beetle

Neotrichaphodioides woytkowskii is a species of beetle of the family Scarabaeidae. It is found in Peru.

== Description ==
Adults reach a length of about 7–8 mm (0.28–0.31 in). They have an oblong-elongate, moderately convex, shiny, piceous brown body, with the margins of the clypeus and sides of the pronotum paler, the legs dark brown and the antennal club piceous.

== Etymology ==
The species is named in honour of F. Woytkowski, who collected all the specimens of the type series.
