= Neotrichaphodioides volxemi =

Scientific classification
- Kingdom: Animalia
- Phylum: Arthropoda
- Clade: Pancrustacea
- Class: Insecta
- Order: Coleoptera
- Suborder: Polyphaga
- Infraorder: Scarabaeiformia
- Family: Scarabaeidae
- Genus: Neotrichaphodioides
- Species: N. volxemi

Binomial name
- Neotrichaphodioides volxemi (Harold, 1876)

Synonyms
- Aphodius volxemi Harold, 1876; Aphodius (Gonaphodiellus) squamifer Petrovitz, 1970

Species of beetle

Neotrichaphodioides volxemi is a species of beetle of the family Scarabaeidae. It is found in Brazil (Distrito Federal, Minas Gerais).

== Description ==
Adults reach a length of about 5–6 mm (0.20–0.24 in). The body is dark testaceous. The clypeus is trapezoidal and the pronotum has punctures of two sizes and a strongly sinuate posterior margin. The elytra are as dark as the disc of the pronotum and head, with a rounded lighter area posteriorly located. The interstriae are strongly convex.

== Life history ==
Specimens have been collected at altitudes of 780 metres.
