= Indoblackburneus =

Scientific classification
- Kingdom: Animalia
- Phylum: Arthropoda
- Clade: Pancrustacea
- Class: Insecta
- Order: Coleoptera
- Suborder: Polyphaga
- Infraorder: Scarabaeiformia
- Family: Scarabaeidae
- Subfamily: Aphodiinae
- Tribe: Aphodiini
- Genus: Indoblackburneus; Schmidt, 1914

Genus of beetles

Indoblackburneus is a genus of beetles of the family Scarabaeidae.

== Species ==
- Indoblackburneus continentalis Mencl, Král & Rakovič, 2019
- Indoblackburneus javanus (Schmidt, 1909)
- Indoblackburneus merbabuanus Mencl, Král & Rakovič, 2019
- Indoblackburneus minutissimus (Schmidt, 1908)
- Indoblackburneus ohkurai (Masumoto, 1992)
- Indoblackburneus sinomeridionalis Mencl, Král & Rakovič, 2019
