= Indoblackburneus minutissimus =

Scientific classification
- Kingdom: Animalia
- Phylum: Arthropoda
- Clade: Pancrustacea
- Class: Insecta
- Order: Coleoptera
- Suborder: Polyphaga
- Infraorder: Scarabaeiformia
- Family: Scarabaeidae
- Genus: Indoblackburneus
- Species: I. minutissimus

Binomial name
- Indoblackburneus minutissimus (Schmidt, 1908)

Synonyms
- Aphodius minutissimus Schmidt, 1908

Species of beetle

Indoblackburneus minutissimus is a species of beetle of the family Scarabaeidae. It is found in India (Karnataka, Tamil Nadu).

== Description ==
Adults reach a length of about 2–2.7 mm (0.079–0.106 in). They have a moderately shining, glabrous, castaneous to dark brown body, with the posterior area of the head, most of the pronotum and scutellum darker than the clypeus, lateral margins of the pronotum and elytra.
