= Indoblackburneus continentalis =

Scientific classification
- Kingdom: Animalia
- Phylum: Arthropoda
- Clade: Pancrustacea
- Class: Insecta
- Order: Coleoptera
- Suborder: Polyphaga
- Infraorder: Scarabaeiformia
- Family: Scarabaeidae
- Genus: Indoblackburneus
- Species: I. continentalis

Binomial name
- Indoblackburneus continentalis Mencl, Král & Rakovič, 2019

Species of beetle

Indoblackburneus continentalis is a species of beetle of the family Scarabaeidae. It is found in Laos, Malaysia, Thailand, Vietnam and China (Yunnan).

== Description ==
Adults reach a length of about 1.8–2.4 mm (0.071–0.094 in). They have a moderately shiny, glabrous, castaneous to dark brown body, with the posterior area of the head, most of the pronotum and scutellum darker than the clypeus, lateral margins of the pronotum and elytra.

== Etymology ==
The species name refers to its occurrence in mainland southeast Asia.
