= Indoblackburneus sinomeridionalis =

Scientific classification
- Kingdom: Animalia
- Phylum: Arthropoda
- Clade: Pancrustacea
- Class: Insecta
- Order: Coleoptera
- Suborder: Polyphaga
- Infraorder: Scarabaeiformia
- Family: Scarabaeidae
- Genus: Indoblackburneus
- Species: I. sinomeridionalis

Binomial name
- Indoblackburneus sinomeridionalis Mencl, Král & Rakovič, 2019

Species of beetle

Indoblackburneus sinomeridionalis is a species of beetle of the family Scarabaeidae. It is found in China (Yunnan).

== Description ==
Adults reach a length of about 3 mm (0.12 in). They have a moderately shining, glabrous, castaneous body. The clypeus and lateral and anterior margins of the pronotum are lighter than the head and disc of the pronotum.

== Etymology ==
The species name refers to its occurrence in southern China.
