= Indoblackburneus ohkurai =

Scientific classification
- Kingdom: Animalia
- Phylum: Arthropoda
- Clade: Pancrustacea
- Class: Insecta
- Order: Coleoptera
- Suborder: Polyphaga
- Infraorder: Scarabaeiformia
- Family: Scarabaeidae
- Genus: Indoblackburneus
- Species: I. ohkurai

Binomial name
- Indoblackburneus ohkurai (Masumoto, 1992)

Synonyms
- Aphodius (Plagiogonus) ohkurai Masumoto, 1992

Species of beetle

Indoblackburneus ohkurai is a species of beetle of the family Scarabaeidae. It is found in Thailand.

== Description ==
Adults reach a length of about 2.7–3.4 mm (0.11–0.13 in).
