= Indoblackburneus merbabuanus =

Scientific classification
- Kingdom: Animalia
- Phylum: Arthropoda
- Clade: Pancrustacea
- Class: Insecta
- Order: Coleoptera
- Suborder: Polyphaga
- Infraorder: Scarabaeiformia
- Family: Scarabaeidae
- Genus: Indoblackburneus
- Species: I. merbabuanus

Binomial name
- Indoblackburneus merbabuanus Mencl, Král & Rakovič, 2019

Species of beetle

Indoblackburneus merbabuanus is a species of beetle of the family Scarabaeidae. It is found in Indonesia (Java).

== Description ==
Adults reach a length of about 2.2–2.3 mm (0.087–0.091 in). They have a moderately shining, glabrous, castaneous to dark brown body, with the anterior and lateral margins of the clypeus and lateral margins of the pronotum lighter.

== Etymology ==
The species name refers to the holotype locality, Mount Merbabu.
