= Indoblackburneus javanus =

Scientific classification
- Kingdom: Animalia
- Phylum: Arthropoda
- Clade: Pancrustacea
- Class: Insecta
- Order: Coleoptera
- Suborder: Polyphaga
- Infraorder: Scarabaeiformia
- Family: Scarabaeidae
- Genus: Indoblackburneus
- Species: I. javanus

Binomial name
- Indoblackburneus javanus (Schmidt, 1909)

Synonyms
- Aphodius javanus Schmidt, 1909; Aphodius minimus Paulian, 1933

Species of beetle

Indoblackburneus javanus is a species of beetle of the family Scarabaeidae. It is found in Indonesia (Java, Flores, Sumatra).

== Description ==
Adults reach a length of about 1.8–2.1 mm (0.071–0.083 in). They have a moderately shining, glabrous, mostly reddish-brown to castaneous body, with the posterior area of the head and the disc and base of the pronotum darker than the elytra.
