= Trichonotuloides latecrenatus =

Scientific classification
- Kingdom: Animalia
- Phylum: Arthropoda
- Clade: Pancrustacea
- Class: Insecta
- Order: Coleoptera
- Suborder: Polyphaga
- Infraorder: Scarabaeiformia
- Family: Scarabaeidae
- Genus: Trichonotuloides
- Species: T. latecrenatus

Binomial name
- Trichonotuloides latecrenatus (Bates, 1887)

Synonyms
- Aphodius latecrenatus Bates, 1887; Aphodius (Trichonotuloides) fossulatipennis Balthasar, 1945

Species of beetle

Trichonotuloides latecrenatus is a species of beetle of the family Scarabaeidae. It is found in Guatemala and Mexico (Chiapas).

== Description ==
Adults reach a length of about 4–4.5 mm (0.16–0.18 in). They have an oblong-oval, moderately convex, subshiny body. The head is glabrous, while the sides of the pronotum and elytral interstices have short hairs. They are dark brownish, with the margin of the clypeus, the fore angles of the pronotum and the apex of the elytra ferrugineous. The antennal club is piceous and the legs are brown-reddish.

== Life history ==
Specimens have been collected in sheep dung.
