= Trichonotuloides glyptus =

Scientific classification
- Kingdom: Animalia
- Phylum: Arthropoda
- Clade: Pancrustacea
- Class: Insecta
- Order: Coleoptera
- Suborder: Polyphaga
- Infraorder: Scarabaeiformia
- Family: Scarabaeidae
- Genus: Trichonotuloides
- Species: T. glyptus

Binomial name
- Trichonotuloides glyptus (Bates, 1887)

Synonyms
- Aphodius glyptus Bates, 1887

Species of beetle

Trichonotuloides glyptus is a species of beetle of the family Scarabaeidae. It is found in Mexico (Colima, Durango, Hidalgo, México, Oaxaca, Puebla, Veracruz).

== Description ==
Adults reach a length of about 4.5–5 mm (0.18–0.20 in). They have an oval-elongate, moderately convex, subopaque body, with silver-grey hairs. They are blackish or piceous black, the head, pronotum and elytra with dark reddish margins.

== Life history ==
Specimens have been collected in dung.
