= Trichonotuloides =

Scientific classification
- Kingdom: Animalia
- Phylum: Arthropoda
- Clade: Pancrustacea
- Class: Insecta
- Order: Coleoptera
- Suborder: Polyphaga
- Infraorder: Scarabaeiformia
- Family: Scarabaeidae
- Subfamily: Aphodiinae
- Tribe: Aphodiini
- Genus: Trichonotuloides; Balthasar, 1945

Synonyms
- Aphodius (Trichonotuloides) Balthasar, 1945

Genus of beetles

Trichonotuloides is a genus of beetles of the family Scarabaeidae.

== Species ==
- Trichonotuloides alfonsinae Dellacasa, Dellacasa & Gordon, 2014
- Trichonotuloides aphoderrans Skelley & Warner, 2015
- Trichonotuloides glyptus (Bates, 1887)
- Trichonotuloides hansferyi Dellacasa, Dellacasa & Gordon, 2014
- Trichonotuloides latecrenatus (Bates, 1887)
