= Trichonotuloides hansferyi =

Scientific classification
- Kingdom: Animalia
- Phylum: Arthropoda
- Clade: Pancrustacea
- Class: Insecta
- Order: Coleoptera
- Suborder: Polyphaga
- Infraorder: Scarabaeiformia
- Family: Scarabaeidae
- Genus: Trichonotuloides
- Species: T. hansferyi

Binomial name
- Trichonotuloides hansferyi Dellacasa, Dellacasa & Gordon, 2014

Species of beetle

Trichonotuloides hansferyi is a species of beetle of the family Scarabaeidae. It is found in Mexico (Veracruz).

== Description ==
Adults reach a length of about 4.5–6 mm (0.18–0.24 in). They have an oval-elongate, convex, subopaque body. The head is almost glabrous, while the pronotum and elytra have short hairs. They are blackish, with the margin of the clypeus brownish-red, the legs dark brown and the antennal club fuscous.

== Life history ==
Specimens have been collected in horse and cow dung.

== Etymology ==
The species is named in honour of the German dytiscidologist Hans Fery.
