= Trichonotuloides alfonsinae =

Scientific classification
- Kingdom: Animalia
- Phylum: Arthropoda
- Clade: Pancrustacea
- Class: Insecta
- Order: Coleoptera
- Suborder: Polyphaga
- Infraorder: Scarabaeiformia
- Family: Scarabaeidae
- Genus: Trichonotuloides
- Species: T. alfonsinae

Binomial name
- Trichonotuloides alfonsinae Dellacasa, Dellacasa & Gordon, 2014

Species of beetle

Trichonotuloides alfonsinae is a species of beetle of the family Scarabaeidae. It is found in Mexico (Puebla, Veracruz).

== Description ==
Adults reach a length of about 3.5–4 mm (0.14–0.16 in). They have an oval-elongate, moderately convex, subopaque, blackish body. The head and pronotum are glabrous, while the elytra have short hairs laterally and subapically.

== Life history ==
Specimens have been collected in sheep dung and human faeces.

== Etymology ==
The species is named in honour of Alfonsina Arriaga Jiménez, who collected all specimens of the type series.
