= Trichonotuloides aphoderrans =

Scientific classification
- Kingdom: Animalia
- Phylum: Arthropoda
- Clade: Pancrustacea
- Class: Insecta
- Order: Coleoptera
- Suborder: Polyphaga
- Infraorder: Scarabaeiformia
- Family: Scarabaeidae
- Genus: Trichonotuloides
- Species: T. aphoderrans

Binomial name
- Trichonotuloides aphoderrans Skelley & Warner, 2015

Species of beetle

Trichonotuloides aphoderrans is a species of beetle of the family Scarabaeidae. It is found in the United States (Arizona).

== Description ==
Adults reach a length of about 3.7–5 mm (0.15–0.20 in). They have an oval-elongate, convex, nearly glossy body. Each puncture on the elytra has a short silver-grey hair. They are blackish or piceous-black, with the head, pronotum and elytra with dark reddish margins.

== Life history ==
Specimens have been collected in elk dung.

== Etymology ==
The species name is derived from Greek aphodos (meaning dung) and Latin errans (meaning wanderer) and refers to the fact that specimens were observed walking on dung and not burrowing into it.
