= Nialus =

Scientific classification
- Kingdom: Animalia
- Phylum: Arthropoda
- Clade: Pancrustacea
- Class: Insecta
- Order: Coleoptera
- Suborder: Polyphaga
- Infraorder: Scarabaeiformia
- Family: Scarabaeidae
- Subfamily: Aphodiinae
- Tribe: Aphodiini
- Genus: Nialus; Mulsant & Rey, 1870

Synonyms
- Aphodius (Nialus) Mulsant & Rey, 1870

Genus of beetles

Nialus is a genus of beetles of the family Scarabaeidae.

== Species ==
- Nialus alienus (Schmidt, 1917)
- Nialus consimilis (Boheman, 1857)
- Nialus discelis (Endrödi, 1964)
- Nialus feculentus (Fairmaire, 1892)
- Nialus jhavanicus (Balthasar, 1971)
- Nialus motschulskyi (Nikritin, 1969)
- Nialus nefandus (Reitter, 1907)
- Nialus politus (Mulsant & Rey, 1870)
- Nialus tetricus (Harold, 1871)
- Nialus turbidus (Bordat, 1992)
- Nialus varians (Duftschmid, 1805)
