= Nialus jhavanicus =

Scientific classification
- Kingdom: Animalia
- Phylum: Arthropoda
- Clade: Pancrustacea
- Class: Insecta
- Order: Coleoptera
- Suborder: Polyphaga
- Infraorder: Scarabaeiformia
- Family: Scarabaeidae
- Genus: Nialus
- Species: N. jhavanicus

Binomial name
- Nialus jhavanicus (Balthasar, 1971)

Synonyms
- Aphodius (Nialus) jhavanicus Balthasar, 1971; Aphodius (Nialus) cobharensis Stebnicka, 1985

Species of beetle

Nialus jhavanicus is a species of beetle of the family Scarabaeidae. It is found in Nepal and India.

== Description ==
Adults reach a length of about 4–4.5 mm (0.16–0.18 in). They have an elongate, convex, subparallel-sided, shiny, glabrous, black or piceous body. The margin of the clypeus and the legs are reddish-brown and the antennal club is testaceous.
