= Nialus varians =

Scientific classification
- Kingdom: Animalia
- Phylum: Arthropoda
- Clade: Pancrustacea
- Class: Insecta
- Order: Coleoptera
- Suborder: Polyphaga
- Infraorder: Scarabaeiformia
- Family: Scarabaeidae
- Genus: Nialus
- Species: N. varians

Binomial name
- Nialus varians (Duftschmid, 1805)

Synonyms
- Aphodius varians Duftschmid, 1805; Aphodius (Nialus) rugosopunctatus Petrovitz, 1971; Aphodius (Nialus) venyigei Endrödi, 1969; Aphodius (Nialus) varians purpurascens Eichler, 1924; Aphodius (Nialus) kocae Reitter, 1897; Aphodius (Calamosternus) fabricii Orbigny, 1896; Aphodius bimaculatus immaculatus Hochhuth, 1873; Aphodius varians punctulatus Mulsant & Rey, 1870; Aphodius matutinalis Gistel, 1857; Aphodius bimaculatus ambiguus Mulsant, 1842; Aphodius bimaculatus punctatellus Mulsant, 1842; Scarabaeus punctulatus Marsham, 1802; Scarabaeus bimaculatus Fabricius, 1787

Species of beetle

Nialus varians is a species of beetle of the family Scarabaeidae. It is found in Albania, Algeria, Armenia, Austria, Azerbaijan, Belarus, Belgium, Bosnia and Herzegovina, Bulgaria, China (Shanghai), Croatia, the Czech Republic, Denmark, France, Georgia, Germany, Great Britain, Greece, Hungary, Iran, Israel, Italy, Kazakhstan, Kosovo, Kyrgyzstan, Latvia, Lithuania, Macedonia, Montenegro, Morocco, the Netherlands, Poland, Portugal, Romania, Russia, Serbia, Slovakia, Slovenia, Spain, Sweden, Switzerland, Tajikistan, Turkey, Turkmenistan, Ukraine and Uzbekistan.

== Description ==
Adults reach a length of about 4–6 mm (0.16–0.24 in). They have an elongate, subcylindrical, convex, shiny, glabrous, black body. The elytra sometimes have a pale reddish humeral spot and may also be reddish.
