= Nialus nefandus =

Scientific classification
- Kingdom: Animalia
- Phylum: Arthropoda
- Clade: Pancrustacea
- Class: Insecta
- Order: Coleoptera
- Suborder: Polyphaga
- Infraorder: Scarabaeiformia
- Family: Scarabaeidae
- Genus: Nialus
- Species: N. nefandus

Binomial name
- Nialus nefandus (Reitter, 1907)

Synonyms
- Aphodius (Plagiogonus) nefandus Reitter, 1907; Aphodius (Nialus) praestes Balthasar, 1946

Species of beetle

Nialus nefandus is a species of beetle of the family Scarabaeidae. It is found in China (Jilin, Sichuan).

== Description ==
Adults reach a length of about 4–4.5 mm (0.16–0.18 in). They have an elongate-oval, slightly convex, glossy, glabrous, yellowish-brown body, with the back of the head and the discal spots on the pronotum dark brown. The margins of the scutellum, the sutural edge, and the striae on the elytra are darkened. The underside is light reddish-brown and the legs are yellowish-brown.
