= Nialus politus =

Scientific classification
- Kingdom: Animalia
- Phylum: Arthropoda
- Clade: Pancrustacea
- Class: Insecta
- Order: Coleoptera
- Suborder: Polyphaga
- Infraorder: Scarabaeiformia
- Family: Scarabaeidae
- Genus: Nialus
- Species: N. politus

Binomial name
- Nialus politus (Mulsant & Rey, 1870)

Synonyms
- Aphodius politus Mulsant & Rey, 1870

Species of beetle

Nialus politus is a species of beetle of the family Scarabaeidae. It is found in Syria.

== Description ==
Adults reach a length of about 5.1–5.6 mm (0.20–0.22 in). They have an elongate, parallel-sided, moderately convex, glossy, blackish-brown body.
