= Koshantschikovius holmi =

Scientific classification
- Kingdom: Animalia
- Phylum: Arthropoda
- Clade: Pancrustacea
- Class: Insecta
- Order: Coleoptera
- Suborder: Polyphaga
- Infraorder: Scarabaeiformia
- Family: Scarabaeidae
- Genus: Koshantschikovius
- Species: K. holmi

Binomial name
- Koshantschikovius holmi (Endrödi, 1983)

Synonyms
- Aphodius (Koshantschikovius) holmi Endrödi, 1983

Species of beetle

Koshantschikovius holmi is a species of beetle of the family Scarabaeidae. It is found in South Africa (Cape).

== Description ==
Adults reach a length of about 3–4 mm (0.12–0.16 in). They have a yellow body, with the vertex and often also the disc of the pronotum somewhat darker. The sutural interval of the elytra is black.
