= Koshantschikovius andrewesi =

Scientific classification
- Kingdom: Animalia
- Phylum: Arthropoda
- Clade: Pancrustacea
- Class: Insecta
- Order: Coleoptera
- Suborder: Polyphaga
- Infraorder: Scarabaeiformia
- Family: Scarabaeidae
- Genus: Koshantschikovius
- Species: K. andrewesi

Binomial name
- Koshantschikovius andrewesi (Schmidt, 1908)

Synonyms
- Aphodius andrewesi Schmidt, 1908

Species of beetle

Koshantschikovius andrewesi is a species of beetle of the family Scarabaeidae. It is found in India (Karnataka) and Nepal.

== Description ==
Adults reach a length of about 3.5–5 mm (0.14–0.20 in). They have a shiny, glabrous, chestnut-brown body, with the back of the head, the pronotum and sometimes also the disc of the elytra darker.
