= Koshantschikovius erytoides =

Scientific classification
- Kingdom: Animalia
- Phylum: Arthropoda
- Clade: Pancrustacea
- Class: Insecta
- Order: Coleoptera
- Suborder: Polyphaga
- Infraorder: Scarabaeiformia
- Family: Scarabaeidae
- Genus: Koshantschikovius
- Species: K. erytoides

Binomial name
- Koshantschikovius erytoides (Endrödi, 1983)

Synonyms
- Aphodius (Koshantschikovius) erytoides Endrödi, 1983

Species of beetle

Koshantschikovius erytoides is a species of beetle of the family Scarabaeidae. It is found in Namibia.

== Description ==
Adults reach a length of about 5–5.5 mm (0.20–0.22 in). They have a shiny, yellowish-brown body, with the vertex, middle of the pronotum and suture of elytra sometimes darker.
