= Koshantschikovius substriatus =

Scientific classification
- Kingdom: Animalia
- Phylum: Arthropoda
- Clade: Pancrustacea
- Class: Insecta
- Order: Coleoptera
- Suborder: Polyphaga
- Infraorder: Scarabaeiformia
- Family: Scarabaeidae
- Genus: Koshantschikovius
- Species: K. substriatus

Binomial name
- Koshantschikovius substriatus (Schmidt, 1911)

Synonyms
- Aphodius substriatus Schmidt, 1911

Species of beetle

Koshantschikovius substriatus is a species of beetle of the family Scarabaeidae. It is found in Ethiopia, Kenya and Cameroon.

== Description ==
Adults reach a length of about 5–6 mm (0.20–0.24 in). They have a stout, convex, sericeous, nearly glabrous body. The elytra however, have short hairs. They are brown-reddish, with the disc of the pronotum and elytral suture piceous. The legs are brown-reddish.
