= Koshantschikovius =

Scientific classification
- Kingdom: Animalia
- Phylum: Arthropoda
- Clade: Pancrustacea
- Class: Insecta
- Order: Coleoptera
- Suborder: Polyphaga
- Infraorder: Scarabaeiformia
- Family: Scarabaeidae
- Subfamily: Aphodiinae
- Tribe: Aphodiini
- Genus: Koshantschikovius; Schmidt, 1914

Synonyms
- Aphodius (Koshantschikovius) Schmidt, 1914

Genus of beetles

Koshantschikovius is a genus of beetles of the family Scarabaeidae.

== Species ==
- Koshantschikovius andrewesi (Schmidt, 1908)
- Koshantschikovius anthonyi (Bordat, 1989)
- Koshantschikovius astacus (Boucomont, 1932)
- Koshantschikovius bifidus (Endrödi, 1967)
- Koshantschikovius chovdgolensis (Endrödi, 1983)
- Koshantschikovius crassigena Bordat, 2009
- Koshantschikovius doguetianus Bordat, 2018
- Koshantschikovius erytoides (Endrödi, 1983)
- Koshantschikovius haematiticus (Boheman, 1857)
- Koshantschikovius hartwigi (Petrovitz, 1967)
- Koshantschikovius holmi (Endrödi, 1983)
- Koshantschikovius latecinctus (Fairmaire, 1903)
- Koshantschikovius motoi (Paulian, 1939)
- Koshantschikovius nagporensis (Petrovitz, 1968)
- Koshantschikovius neohaematiticus (Landin, 1967)
- Koshantschikovius oscari Bordat, 2015
- Koshantschikovius peculator (Balthasar, 1971)
- Koshantschikovius schmitzi (Bordat, 1990)
- Koshantschikovius snizeki Bordat, 2005
- Koshantschikovius splendens (Balthasar, 1935)
- Koshantschikovius substriatoides (Bordat, 1990)
- Koshantschikovius substriatus (Schmidt, 1911)
- Koshantschikovius sulcifrons (Bordat, 1990)
- Koshantschikovius szunyoghyi (Endrödi, 1971)
- Koshantschikovius ventriosus Bordat, 2014
- Koshantschikovius youngai (Endrödi, 1967)
- Koshantschikovius zambiensis Bordat, 2016
