= Aphodobius innocens =

Scientific classification
- Kingdom: Animalia
- Phylum: Arthropoda
- Clade: Pancrustacea
- Class: Insecta
- Order: Coleoptera
- Suborder: Polyphaga
- Infraorder: Scarabaeiformia
- Family: Scarabaeidae
- Genus: Aphodobius
- Species: A. innocens

Binomial name
- Aphodobius innocens (Schmidt, 1910)

Synonyms
- Aphodius innocens Schmidt, 1910

Species of beetle

Aphodobius innocens is a species of beetle of the family Scarabaeidae. It is found in Somalia and South Africa.

== Description ==
Adults reach a length of about 4–5 mm (0.16–0.20 in). They have an elongate, shallowly convex, yellowish-brown body, with the head (excluding its reddish, translucent outer margin), as well as the center of the pronotum and the elytra darker.
