= Aphodobius inornatus =

Scientific classification
- Kingdom: Animalia
- Phylum: Arthropoda
- Clade: Pancrustacea
- Class: Insecta
- Order: Coleoptera
- Suborder: Polyphaga
- Infraorder: Scarabaeiformia
- Family: Scarabaeidae
- Genus: Aphodobius
- Species: A. inornatus

Binomial name
- Aphodobius inornatus (Schmidt, 1908)

Synonyms
- Aphodius inornatus Schmidt, 1908

Species of beetle

Aphodobius inornatus is a species of beetle of the family Scarabaeidae. It is found in Kenya, the Democratic Republic of the Congo and South Africa (Transvaal).

== Description ==
Adults reach a length of about 4–5.5 mm (0.16–0.22 in). They have an elongate-oval, moderately convex, glabrous body. The head and pronotum are shiny and brownish, while the elytra are sericeous and brown-yellowish, with the suture, a discal spot and sometimes also the striae dark brownish. The margin of the clypeus and the sides of the pronotum are yellowish and the scutellum is brown-yellowish.
