= Aphodobius =

Scientific classification
- Kingdom: Animalia
- Phylum: Arthropoda
- Clade: Pancrustacea
- Class: Insecta
- Order: Coleoptera
- Suborder: Polyphaga
- Infraorder: Scarabaeiformia
- Family: Scarabaeidae
- Subfamily: Aphodiinae
- Tribe: Aphodiini
- Genus: Aphodobius; Péringuey, 1901

Synonyms
- Aphodius (Esymoides) Balthasar, 1945; Aphodius (Arrowiellus) Balthasar, 1933

Genus of beetles

Aphodobius is a genus of beetles of the family Scarabaeidae.

== Species ==
- Aphodobius amplipennis (Balthasar, 1945)
- Aphodobius bernoni (Endrödi, 1980)
- Aphodobius bicoloratus (Schmidt, 1908)
- Aphodobius erugatus (Harold, 1871)
- Aphodobius fentoni (Endrödi, 1982)
- Aphodobius heynei (Schmidt, 1911)
- Aphodobius innocens (Schmidt, 1910)
- Aphodobius inornatus (Schmidt, 1908)
- Aphodobius mulciber (Balthasar, 1933)
- Aphodobius partitus (Endrödi, 1956)
- Aphodobius peringueyi (Schmidt, 1909)
- Aphodobius rubrothorax Bordat, 2005
- Aphodobius tessmanni (Petrovitz, 1969)
- Aphodobius transvaalicus (Petrovitz, 1964)
- Aphodobius ugandanus (Balthasar, 1963)
- Aphodobius villosulus Péringuey, 1901
