= Aphodobius amplipennis =

Scientific classification
- Kingdom: Animalia
- Phylum: Arthropoda
- Clade: Pancrustacea
- Class: Insecta
- Order: Coleoptera
- Suborder: Polyphaga
- Infraorder: Scarabaeiformia
- Family: Scarabaeidae
- Genus: Aphodobius
- Species: A. amplipennis

Binomial name
- Aphodobius amplipennis (Balthasar, 1945)

Synonyms
- Aphodius (Esymoides) amplipennis Balthasar, 1945

Species of beetle

Aphodobius amplipennis is a species of beetle of the family Scarabaeidae. It is found in China (Sichuan).

== Description ==
Adults reach a length of about 4 mm (0.16 in). They have an elongate-oval, moderately convex, glossy, glabrous, light straw-yellow body, with the head and most of the pronotum darker brown. The scutellum has a dark border. There is a faint spot on the elytra and the sutural margin is blackened. The underside is reddish-brown and the legs are yellowish-brown.
