= Aphodobius mulciber =

Scientific classification
- Kingdom: Animalia
- Phylum: Arthropoda
- Clade: Pancrustacea
- Class: Insecta
- Order: Coleoptera
- Suborder: Polyphaga
- Infraorder: Scarabaeiformia
- Family: Scarabaeidae
- Genus: Aphodobius
- Species: A. mulciber

Binomial name
- Aphodobius mulciber (Balthasar, 1933)

Synonyms
- Aphodius (Arrowiellus) mulciber Balthasar, 1933

Species of beetle

Aphodobius mulciber is a species of beetle of the family Scarabaeidae. It is found in Tanzania.

== Description ==
Adults reach a length of about 6 mm (0.24 in). They have an almost flat, glabrous, shiny body, with the elytra very finely microreticulate. They are brown-yellowish, with the head, pronotum and elytral suture darker and with the legs dark brownish.
