= Nobius gresseri =

Scientific classification
- Kingdom: Animalia
- Phylum: Arthropoda
- Clade: Pancrustacea
- Class: Insecta
- Order: Coleoptera
- Suborder: Polyphaga
- Infraorder: Scarabaeiformia
- Family: Scarabaeidae
- Genus: Nobius
- Species: N. gresseri

Binomial name
- Nobius gresseri (Semenov, 1898)

Synonyms
- Aphodius gresseri Semenov, 1898; Aphodius (Nobius) korgaldzhensis Nikolajev, 1987

Species of beetle

Nobius gresseri is a species of beetle of the family Scarabaeidae. It is found in Armenia, Russia and Ukraine.

== Description ==
Adults reach a length of about 4.3–4.5 mm (0.17–0.18 in). They are very similar to Nobius serotinus, but somewhat slimmer and the elytra have a slightly different coloration. The nebulous spot is usually somewhat darker, and there is no pre-apical spot.
