= Nobius bosaki =

Scientific classification
- Kingdom: Animalia
- Phylum: Arthropoda
- Clade: Pancrustacea
- Class: Insecta
- Order: Coleoptera
- Suborder: Polyphaga
- Infraorder: Scarabaeiformia
- Family: Scarabaeidae
- Genus: Nobius
- Species: N. bosaki

Binomial name
- Nobius bosaki (Tesař, 1945)

Synonyms
- Aphodius (Nobius) bosaki Tesař, 1945

Species of beetle

Nobius bosaki is a species of beetle of the family Scarabaeidae. It is found in China (Sichuan).

== Description ==
Adults reach a length of about 5 mm (0.20 in). They have a brown body, with most of the head (except for the anterior and lateral margins) and the disc of the pronotum darkened. The elytra are yellowish-brown, with a darkened sutural margin and a lighter preapical spot.
