= Nobius =

Scientific classification
- Kingdom: Animalia
- Phylum: Arthropoda
- Clade: Pancrustacea
- Class: Insecta
- Order: Coleoptera
- Suborder: Polyphaga
- Infraorder: Scarabaeiformia
- Family: Scarabaeidae
- Subfamily: Aphodiinae
- Tribe: Aphodiini
- Genus: Nobius; Mulsant & Rey, 1870

Synonyms
- Aphodius (Nobius) Mulsant & Rey, 1870

Genus of beetles

Nobius is a genus of beetles of the family Scarabaeidae.

== Species ==
- Nobius bosaki (Tesař, 1945)
- Nobius chaldaeus (Petrovitz, 1971)
- Nobius costatellus (Schmidt, 1922)
- Nobius dosangi (Akhmetova & Frolov, 2008)
- Nobius gresseri (Semenov, 1898)
- Nobius hepaticus (Roth, 1851)
- Nobius rhodiensis (Baraud, 1976)
- Nobius serotinus (Panzer, 1799)
- Nobius zumpti (Balthasar, 1937)
