= Nobius costatellus =

Scientific classification
- Kingdom: Animalia
- Phylum: Arthropoda
- Clade: Pancrustacea
- Class: Insecta
- Order: Coleoptera
- Suborder: Polyphaga
- Infraorder: Scarabaeiformia
- Family: Scarabaeidae
- Genus: Nobius
- Species: N. costatellus

Binomial name
- Nobius costatellus (Schmidt, 1922)

Synonyms
- Aphodius costatellus Schmidt, 1922; Aphodius (Melinopterus) costulatus Reitter, 1896

Species of beetle

Nobius costatellus is a species of beetle of the family Scarabaeidae. It is found in the Russian Far East and Siberia.

== Description ==
Adults reach a length of about 5 mm (0.20 in). They have a strongly convex, shiny, glabrous, chestnut-brown body. The head is mostly yellowish-brown and the sides of the pronotum and the tips of the elytra are lighter. The legs are reddish-brown.
