= Nobius serotinus =

Scientific classification
- Kingdom: Animalia
- Phylum: Arthropoda
- Clade: Pancrustacea
- Class: Insecta
- Order: Coleoptera
- Suborder: Polyphaga
- Infraorder: Scarabaeiformia
- Family: Scarabaeidae
- Genus: Nobius
- Species: N. serotinus

Binomial name
- Nobius serotinus (Panzer, 1799)

Synonyms
- Scarabaeus serotinus Panzer, 1799; Aphodius (Nobius) serotinus kochi Balthasar, 1964; Aphodius (Melinopterus) x-signum Reitter, 1892; Scarabaeus minutus Herbst, 1783

Species of beetle

Nobius serotinus is a species of beetle of the family Scarabaeidae. It is found in Armenia, Austria, Belarus, Bosnia and Herzegovina, China (Heilongjiang), Croatia, the Czech Republic, Finland, Georgia, Germany, Greece, Hungary, Israel, Italy, Kazakhstan, Latvia, Poland, Romania, Russia (including the Russian Far East and Siberia), Slovakia, Slovenia, Sweden, Switzerland, Turkey and Ukraine.

== Description ==
Adults reach a length of about 4–5 mm (0.16–0.20 in). They have an oval-elongate, moderately convex, shiny, glabrous, blackish body, with the front angles of the pronotum reddish and the elytra pale red-brownish with darker suture and a piceous discal spot, as well as a small piceous preapical spot.
