= Pseudopharaphodius tumulosus =

Scientific classification
- Kingdom: Animalia
- Phylum: Arthropoda
- Clade: Pancrustacea
- Class: Insecta
- Order: Coleoptera
- Suborder: Polyphaga
- Infraorder: Scarabaeiformia
- Family: Scarabaeidae
- Genus: Pseudopharaphodius
- Species: P. tumulosus

Binomial name
- Pseudopharaphodius tumulosus (Schmidt, 1910)

Synonyms
- Aphodius tumulosus Schmidt, 1910; Aphodius (Pleuraphodius) punctobasalis Endrödi, 1964

Species of beetle

Pseudopharaphodius tumulosus is a species of beetle of the family Scarabaeidae. It is found in Ethiopia, Kenya, Malawi, Mozambique, the Democratic Republic of the Congo, Tanzania and Zimbabwe.

== Description ==
Adults reach a length of about 4 mm (0.16 in). They have a shiny, elongate, convex, black body, with the front of the head, the anterior and lateral margins of the pronotum, as well as the sides and apex of the elytra slightly lighter.
