= Pseudopharaphodius =

Scientific classification
- Kingdom: Animalia
- Phylum: Arthropoda
- Clade: Pancrustacea
- Class: Insecta
- Order: Coleoptera
- Suborder: Polyphaga
- Infraorder: Scarabaeiformia
- Family: Scarabaeidae
- Subfamily: Aphodiinae
- Tribe: Aphodiini
- Genus: Pseudopharaphodius; Bordat, 1990

Synonyms
- Aphodius (Pseudopharaphodius) Bordat, 1990

Genus of beetles

Pseudopharaphodius is a genus of beetles of the family Scarabaeidae.

== Species ==
- Pseudopharaphodius abstrusus Bordat, 2018
- Pseudopharaphodius admirandus Bordat, 2018
- Pseudopharaphodius annoyeri Bordat, 2018
- Pseudopharaphodius anthrax (Gerstaecker, 1871)
- Pseudopharaphodius apicesetosus (Clément, 1969)
- Pseudopharaphodius bucolicus Bordat, 2011
- Pseudopharaphodius burundiensis Bordat, 2011
- Pseudopharaphodius dalabaensis (Petrovitz, 1973)
- Pseudopharaphodius janssensi (Paulian, 1939)
- Pseudopharaphodius kaszabi (Endrödi, 1957)
- Pseudopharaphodius novus (Schmidt, 1910)
- Pseudopharaphodius phalacronotoides (Balthasar, 1960)
- Pseudopharaphodius propinquus Bordat, 2011
- Pseudopharaphodius rufomaculatus (Petrovitz, 1958)
- Pseudopharaphodius tai Bordat, 2011
- Pseudopharaphodius tumulosus (Schmidt, 1910)
- Pseudopharaphodius urostigmoides (Schmidt, 1914)
- Pseudopharaphodius verecundus Bordat, 2011
- Pseudopharaphodius zinqueae Bordat, 2015
