= Pseudopharaphodius novus =

Scientific classification
- Kingdom: Animalia
- Phylum: Arthropoda
- Clade: Pancrustacea
- Class: Insecta
- Order: Coleoptera
- Suborder: Polyphaga
- Infraorder: Scarabaeiformia
- Family: Scarabaeidae
- Genus: Pseudopharaphodius
- Species: P. novus

Binomial name
- Pseudopharaphodius novus (Schmidt, 1910)

Synonyms
- Aphodius novus Schmidt, 1910

Species of beetle

Pseudopharaphodius novus is a species of beetle of the family Scarabaeidae. It is found in Ethiopia, Ghana, Ivory Coast, the Democratic Republic of the Congo, Guinea, the Republic of the Congo, South Africa, Tanzania, Uganda, Zambia and Zimbabwe.

== Description ==
Adults reach a length of about 2.5 mm (0.098 in). They have an elongate, convex, dark brown body, with the clypeus, sides of the pronotum, scutellum and suture lighter.
