= Pseudopharaphodius anthrax =

Scientific classification
- Kingdom: Animalia
- Phylum: Arthropoda
- Clade: Pancrustacea
- Class: Insecta
- Order: Coleoptera
- Suborder: Polyphaga
- Infraorder: Scarabaeiformia
- Family: Scarabaeidae
- Genus: Pseudopharaphodius
- Species: P. anthrax

Binomial name
- Pseudopharaphodius anthrax (Gerstaecker, 1871)

Synonyms
- Aphodius anthrax Gerstaecker, 1871; Aphodius (Blackburneus) testaceicolor Balthasar, 1937; Aphodius ditus Péringuey, 1901

Species of beetle

Pseudopharaphodius anthrax is a species of beetle of the family Scarabaeidae. It is found in Angola, Burundi, Cameroon, Ethiopia, Gabon, Ghana, Ivory Coast, Kenya, Malawi, Mozambique, Namibia, the Democratic Republic of the Congo, Guinea, the Republic of the Congo, South Africa, Rwanda, Senegal, Sudan, Tanzania and Zimbabwe.

== Description ==
Adults reach a length of about 3–4 mm (0.12–0.16 in). They have a convex, elongate, shiny, nearly glabrous, brown-blackish or sometimes brown-reddish body.
