= Sugrames johni =

Scientific classification
- Kingdom: Animalia
- Phylum: Arthropoda
- Clade: Pancrustacea
- Class: Insecta
- Order: Coleoptera
- Suborder: Polyphaga
- Infraorder: Scarabaeiformia
- Family: Scarabaeidae
- Genus: Sugrames
- Species: S. johni

Binomial name
- Sugrames johni Kieseritzky, 1928

Species of beetle

Sugrames johni is a species of beetle of the family Scarabaeidae. It is found in Kazakhstan.

== Description ==
Adults reach a length of about 3 mm (0.12 in). They are very similar to Sugrames reichardti and Sugrames hauseri, but the back of the head and the disc of the pronotum are lighter and the antennal club is also light. Also, the underside is uniformly yellow-brown.
