= Sugrames =

Scientific classification
- Kingdom: Animalia
- Phylum: Arthropoda
- Clade: Pancrustacea
- Class: Insecta
- Order: Coleoptera
- Suborder: Polyphaga
- Infraorder: Scarabaeiformia
- Family: Scarabaeidae
- Subfamily: Aphodiinae
- Tribe: Aphodiini
- Genus: Sugrames; Reitter, 1894

Synonyms
- Sugrames (Pseudosugrames) Kieseritzky, 1928

Genus of beetles

Sugrames is a genus of beetles of the family Scarabaeidae.

== Species ==
- Sugrames auriculatus (Reitter, 1892)
- Sugrames capensis Endrödi, 1983
- Sugrames hauseri Reitter, 1894
- Sugrames johni Kieseritsky, 1928
- Sugrames reichardti Kieseritzky, 1928
