= Sugrames capensis =

Scientific classification
- Kingdom: Animalia
- Phylum: Arthropoda
- Clade: Pancrustacea
- Class: Insecta
- Order: Coleoptera
- Suborder: Polyphaga
- Infraorder: Scarabaeiformia
- Family: Scarabaeidae
- Genus: Sugrames
- Species: S. capensis

Binomial name
- Sugrames capensis Endrödi, 1983

Species of beetle

Sugrames capensis is a species of beetle of the family Scarabaeidae. It is found in Namibia.

== Description ==
Adults reach a length of about 5–5.2 mm (0.20–0.20 in). They have a moderately shiny, uniformly dark reddish brown body.
