= Sugrames auriculatus =

Scientific classification
- Kingdom: Animalia
- Phylum: Arthropoda
- Clade: Pancrustacea
- Class: Insecta
- Order: Coleoptera
- Suborder: Polyphaga
- Infraorder: Scarabaeiformia
- Family: Scarabaeidae
- Genus: Sugrames
- Species: S. auriculatus

Binomial name
- Sugrames auriculatus (Reitter, 1892)

Synonyms
- Aphodius (Mendidius) auriculatus Reitter, 1892

Species of beetle

Sugrames auriculatus is a species of beetle of the family Scarabaeidae. It is found in Uzbekistan.

== Description ==
Adults reach a length of about 4–4.3 mm (0.16–0.17 in). They have a strongly convex, shiny, glabrous, broadly oval body. The dorsal surface is light reddish-yellow-brown, with the disc of the pronotum somewhat darkened and with the frontal suture, the margins of the pronotum, the edges of the scutellum and the sutural margin of the elytra also darker.
