= Sugrames reichardti =

Scientific classification
- Kingdom: Animalia
- Phylum: Arthropoda
- Clade: Pancrustacea
- Class: Insecta
- Order: Coleoptera
- Suborder: Polyphaga
- Infraorder: Scarabaeiformia
- Family: Scarabaeidae
- Genus: Sugrames
- Species: S. reichardti

Binomial name
- Sugrames reichardti Kieseritzky, 1928

Species of beetle

Sugrames reichardti is a species of beetle of the family Scarabaeidae. It is found in Kazakhstan and Turkmenistan.

== Description ==
Adults reach a length of about 2.3 mm (0.091 in). They have a strongly convex, shiny, glabrous body. The dorsal surface is dingy yellow, with the back of the head and the disc of the pronotum blackish-brown and the elytra with darkened lateral and apical margins. The thorax and abdomen are dark brown and the legs are mostly light yellowish-brown.
