= Sugrames hauseri =

Scientific classification
- Kingdom: Animalia
- Phylum: Arthropoda
- Clade: Pancrustacea
- Class: Insecta
- Order: Coleoptera
- Suborder: Polyphaga
- Infraorder: Scarabaeiformia
- Family: Scarabaeidae
- Genus: Sugrames
- Species: S. hauseri

Binomial name
- Sugrames hauseri Reitter, 1894

Synonyms
- Sugrames uvarovi Semenov & Medvedev, 1927

Species of beetle

Sugrames hauseri is a species of beetle of the family Scarabaeidae. It is found in Afghanistan, Kazakhstan, Russia, Turkmenistan and Uzbekistan.

== Description ==
Adults reach a length of about 3.5 mm (0.14 in). They have a strongly convex, shiny, reddish body, with the head and disc of the pronotum darker. The scutellum is brownish and the elytra are yellowish with brownish suture.
