= Loraphodius suarius =

Scientific classification
- Kingdom: Animalia
- Phylum: Arthropoda
- Clade: Pancrustacea
- Class: Insecta
- Order: Coleoptera
- Suborder: Polyphaga
- Infraorder: Scarabaeiformia
- Family: Scarabaeidae
- Genus: Loraphodius
- Species: L. suarius

Binomial name
- Loraphodius suarius (Faldermann, 1836)

Synonyms
- Aphodius suarius Faldermann, 1836; Aphodius (Loraphodius) suarius nigripennis Mikšić, 1962; Aphodius (Pseudagolius) ukrainicus Balthasar, 1946; Aphodius brunnipennis Dejean, 1833

Species of beetle

Loraphodius suarius is a species of beetle of the family Scarabaeidae. It is found in Armenia, Austria, Bosnia and Herzegovina, Bulgaria, Croatia, Cyprus, France, Greece, Hungary, Israel, Italy, Lebanon, Macedonia, Russia, Slovakia, Syria, Turkey and Ukraine.

== Description ==
Adults reach a length of about 5–6 mm (0.20–0.24 in). They have an elongate, convex, shiny, glabrous, piceous-blackish or chestnut-brown body. The head, pronotum and elytra have paler margins.
