= Loraphodius latisulcus =

Scientific classification
- Kingdom: Animalia
- Phylum: Arthropoda
- Clade: Pancrustacea
- Class: Insecta
- Order: Coleoptera
- Suborder: Polyphaga
- Infraorder: Scarabaeiformia
- Family: Scarabaeidae
- Genus: Loraphodius
- Species: L. latisulcus

Binomial name
- Loraphodius latisulcus (Reitter, 1892)

Synonyms
- Aphodius (Loraphodius) latisulcus Reitter, 1892; Aphodius latisulcus secundus Roubal, 1911

Species of beetle

Loraphodius latisulcus is a species of beetle of the family Scarabaeidae. It is found in Armenia, Georgia, Russia and Ukraine.

== Description ==
Adults reach a length of about 5–5.5 mm (0.20–0.22 in). They have a quite strongly convex, shiny, glabrous, black body, with the sides of the head and pronotum lighter. The elytra, scutellum, underside and legs are chestnut-brown.
