= Loraphodius kashmirensis =

Scientific classification
- Kingdom: Animalia
- Phylum: Arthropoda
- Clade: Pancrustacea
- Class: Insecta
- Order: Coleoptera
- Suborder: Polyphaga
- Infraorder: Scarabaeiformia
- Family: Scarabaeidae
- Genus: Loraphodius
- Species: L. kashmirensis

Binomial name
- Loraphodius kashmirensis (Sharp, 1878)

Synonyms
- Aphodius kashmirensis Sharp, 1878; Aphodius (Ammoecius) tshingchaicus Balthasar, 1971

Species of beetle

Loraphodius kashmirensis is a species of beetle of the family Scarabaeidae. It is found in Afghanistan, China (Qinghai, Xizang), India (Jammu & Kashmir) and Pakistan.

== Description ==
Adults reach a length of about 5.8–6.3 mm (0.23–0.25 in). They have a strongly convex, shiny, glabrous, black body. The elytra are often dark reddish-brown, especially at the apex.
