= Loraphodius corrugatus =

Scientific classification
- Kingdom: Animalia
- Phylum: Arthropoda
- Clade: Pancrustacea
- Class: Insecta
- Order: Coleoptera
- Suborder: Polyphaga
- Infraorder: Scarabaeiformia
- Family: Scarabaeidae
- Genus: Loraphodius
- Species: L. corrugatus

Binomial name
- Loraphodius corrugatus (Petrovitz, 1954)

Synonyms
- Aphodius (Agrilinus) corrugatus Petrovitz, 1954

Species of beetle

Loraphodius corrugatus is a species of beetle of the family Scarabaeidae. It is found in Iran.

== Description ==
Adults reach a length of about 5.5 mm (0.22 in). They have a moderately convex, black body, with the margin of the clypeus and the anterior angles of the pronotum reddish. The elytra are reddish-brown, each with a black discal spot and a black mark before the apex.
