= Loraphodius =

Scientific classification
- Kingdom: Animalia
- Phylum: Arthropoda
- Clade: Pancrustacea
- Class: Insecta
- Order: Coleoptera
- Suborder: Polyphaga
- Infraorder: Scarabaeiformia
- Family: Scarabaeidae
- Subfamily: Aphodiinae
- Tribe: Aphodiini
- Genus: Loraphodius; Reitter, 1892

Synonyms
- Aphodius (Loraphodius) Reitter, 1892

Genus of beetles

Loraphodius is a genus of beetles of the family Scarabaeidae.

== Species ==
- Loraphodius corrugatus (Petrovitz, 1954)
- Loraphodius kashmirensis (Sharp, 1878)
- Loraphodius latisulcus (Reitter, 1892)
- Loraphodius lebruni (Paulian, 1939)
- Loraphodius suarius (Faldermann, 1836)
