= Biralus menetriesi =

Scientific classification
- Kingdom: Animalia
- Phylum: Arthropoda
- Clade: Pancrustacea
- Class: Insecta
- Order: Coleoptera
- Suborder: Polyphaga
- Infraorder: Scarabaeiformia
- Family: Scarabaeidae
- Genus: Biralus
- Species: B. menetriesi

Binomial name
- Biralus menetriesi (Ménétriés, 1849)

Synonyms
- Aphodius menetriesi Ménétriés, 1849; Aphodius menetriesi Dejean, 1833

Species of beetle

Biralus menetriesi is a species of beetle of the family Scarabaeidae. It is found in Afghanistan, Azerbaijan, Iran, Kazakhstan, Kyrgyzstan, Russia, Tajikistan, Turkey, Turkmenistan and Uzbekistan.

== Description ==
Adults reach a length of about 5–7 mm (0.20–0.28 in). They are very similar to Biralus satellitius and Biralus equinus, but the black marking on the elytra is narrower and the elytra have short pubescence along the posterior and lateral margins.
