= Biralus =

Scientific classification
- Kingdom: Animalia
- Phylum: Arthropoda
- Clade: Pancrustacea
- Class: Insecta
- Order: Coleoptera
- Suborder: Polyphaga
- Infraorder: Scarabaeiformia
- Family: Scarabaeidae
- Subfamily: Aphodiinae
- Tribe: Aphodiini
- Genus: Biralus; Mulsant & Rey, 1870

Synonyms
- Aphodius (Biralus) Mulsant & Rey, 1870

Genus of beetles

Biralus is a genus of beetles of the family Scarabaeidae.

== Species ==
- Biralus equinus (Faldermann, 1836)
- Biralus jhelumensis (Rakovič, 1991)
- Biralus mahunkaorum Ádám, 1983
- Biralus menetriesi (Ménétriés, 1849)
- Biralus satellitius (Herbst, 1789)
