= Biralus equinus =

Scientific classification
- Kingdom: Animalia
- Phylum: Arthropoda
- Clade: Pancrustacea
- Class: Insecta
- Order: Coleoptera
- Suborder: Polyphaga
- Infraorder: Scarabaeiformia
- Family: Scarabaeidae
- Genus: Biralus
- Species: B. equinus

Binomial name
- Biralus equinus (Faldermann, 1836)

Synonyms
- Aphodius equinus Faldermann, 1836

Species of beetle

Biralus equinus is a species of beetle of the family Scarabaeidae. It is found in Armenia, Iran, Iraq, Israel, Jordan, Kyrgyzstan, Syria and Turkey.

== Description ==
Adults reach a length of about 5.5–7.5 mm (0.22–0.30 in). They are very similar to Biralus satellitius, but the head is somewhat longer and the lateral margin of the pronotum leaves the hind angles exposed, the striae on the elytra are less widened posteriorly, and the punctation of the intervals is somewhat more robust.
