= Biralus satellitius =

Scientific classification
- Kingdom: Animalia
- Phylum: Arthropoda
- Clade: Pancrustacea
- Class: Insecta
- Order: Coleoptera
- Suborder: Polyphaga
- Infraorder: Scarabaeiformia
- Family: Scarabaeidae
- Genus: Biralus
- Species: B. satellitius

Binomial name
- Biralus satellitius (Herbst, 1789)

Synonyms
- Scarabaeus satellitius Herbst, 1789; Aphodius (Acrossus) satellitius invisibilis Dalla Torre, 1879; Aphodius planus Schmidt, 1840; Scarabaeus decipiens Schrank, 1798; Scarabaeus pecari Fabricius, 1792; Scarabaeus affinis Brahm, 1790

Species of beetle

Biralus satellitius is a species of beetle of the family Scarabaeidae. It is found in Albania, Algeria, Armenia, Austria, Azerbaijan, Belgium, Bosnia and Herzegovina, Bulgaria, Croatia, Cyprus, Czech Republic, France, Germany, Georgia, Greece, Hungary, Iran, Iraq, Israel, Kazakhstan, Lebanon, Luxembourg, Moldova, Montenegro, Morocco, the Netherlands, Poland, Portugal, Romania, Russia, Serbia, Slovenia, Slovakia, Spain, Switzerland, Syria, Tunisia, Turkey, Turkmenistan and Ukraine.

== Description ==
Adults reach a length of about 5–9 mm (0.20–0.35 in). They have an elongate-oval, flat, shiny, glabrous body. The head, pronotum and scutellum are blackish, while the elytra are dark reddish with the suture, a pre-apical spot and the lateral margins blackish.
