= Ozodius windyensis =

Scientific classification
- Kingdom: Animalia
- Phylum: Arthropoda
- Clade: Pancrustacea
- Class: Insecta
- Order: Coleoptera
- Suborder: Polyphaga
- Infraorder: Scarabaeiformia
- Family: Scarabaeidae
- Genus: Ozodius
- Species: O. windyensis

Binomial name
- Ozodius windyensis (Stebnicka & Howden, 1995)

Synonyms
- Drepanocanthoides windyensis Stebnicka & Howden, 1995

Species of beetle

Ozodius windyensis is a species of beetle of the family Scarabaeidae. It is found in Australia (Western Australia).

== Description ==
Adults reach a length of about 3.2–4 mm (0.13–0.16 in). They have an elongate, shining body. The head and pronotum are brown, but the sides of the latter are yellowish brown. The elytra are brown and the legs yellowish.
