= Ozodius canberrae =

Scientific classification
- Kingdom: Animalia
- Phylum: Arthropoda
- Clade: Pancrustacea
- Class: Insecta
- Order: Coleoptera
- Suborder: Polyphaga
- Infraorder: Scarabaeiformia
- Family: Scarabaeidae
- Genus: Ozodius
- Species: O. canberrae

Binomial name
- Ozodius canberrae (Stebnicka & Howden, 1995)

Synonyms
- Drepanocanthoides canberrae Stebnicka & Howden, 1995

Species of beetle

Ozodius canberrae is a species of beetle of the family Scarabaeidae. It is found in Australia (New South Wales, Victoria, Australian Capital Territory).

== Description ==
Adults reach a length of about 3.2–3.4 mm (0.13–0.13 in). They have an elongate-oval, shining brown body, with the sides of the pronotum and elytra light brown and the legs yellowish.
