= Ozodius neglectus =

Scientific classification
- Kingdom: Animalia
- Phylum: Arthropoda
- Clade: Pancrustacea
- Class: Insecta
- Order: Coleoptera
- Suborder: Polyphaga
- Infraorder: Scarabaeiformia
- Family: Scarabaeidae
- Genus: Ozodius
- Species: O. neglectus

Binomial name
- Ozodius neglectus (Schmidt, 1912)

Synonyms
- Aphodius neglectus Schmidt, 1912; Drepanocanthoides neglectus; Aphodius (Drepanocanthoides) demarzi Petrovitz, 1958; Aphodius parvoniger Lea, 1923

Species of beetle

Ozodius neglectus is a species of beetle of the family Scarabaeidae. It is found in Australia (Western Australia).

== Description ==
Adults reach a length of about 2.5–3.2 mm (0.098–0.126 in). They have an elongate-oval body, with the head and pronotum black, but the sides of the pronotum brown or yellowish brown. The elytra are yellow, brown or black and the legs are yellow to dark brown.

== Life history ==
Specimens have been found in open sclerophyll and sandy heath areas and are attracted to dung.
