= Ozodius walpolensis =

Scientific classification
- Kingdom: Animalia
- Phylum: Arthropoda
- Clade: Pancrustacea
- Class: Insecta
- Order: Coleoptera
- Suborder: Polyphaga
- Infraorder: Scarabaeiformia
- Family: Scarabaeidae
- Genus: Ozodius
- Species: O. walpolensis

Binomial name
- Ozodius walpolensis (Stebnicka & Howden, 1995)

Synonyms
- Drepanocanthoides walpolensis Stebnicka & Howden, 1995

Species of beetle

Ozodius walpolensis is a species of beetle of the family Scarabaeidae. It is found in Australia (Western Australia).

== Description ==
Adults reach a length of about 3.3–3.8 mm (0.13–0.15 in). They have an elongate-oval, dark, shining body. Part of the head and the sides of the pronotum are reddish brown and the apical area of the elytra is lighter.
