= Ozodius =

Scientific classification
- Kingdom: Animalia
- Phylum: Arthropoda
- Clade: Pancrustacea
- Class: Insecta
- Order: Coleoptera
- Suborder: Polyphaga
- Infraorder: Scarabaeiformia
- Family: Scarabaeidae
- Subfamily: Aphodiinae
- Tribe: Aphodiini
- Genus: Ozodius; Skelley, 2007

Genus of beetles

Ozodius is a genus of beetles of the family Scarabaeidae.

== Species ==
- Ozodius canberrae (Stebnicka & Howden, 1995)
- Ozodius neglectus (Schmidt, 1912)
- Ozodius walpolensis (Stebnicka & Howden, 1995)
- Ozodius windyensis (Stebnicka & Howden, 1995)
