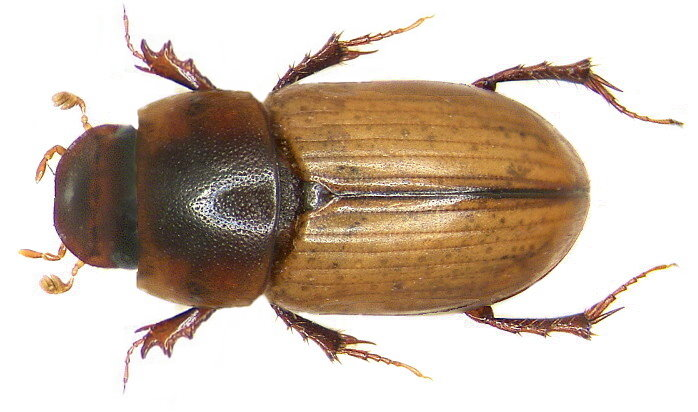

Scientific classification
- Kingdom: Animalia
- Phylum: Arthropoda
- Clade: Pancrustacea
- Class: Insecta
- Order: Coleoptera
- Suborder: Polyphaga
- Infraorder: Scarabaeiformia
- Family: Scarabaeidae
- Genus: Acanthobodilus
- Species: A. immundus

Binomial name
- Acanthobodilus immundus (Creutzer, 1799)

Synonyms
- Aphodius immundus Creutzer, 1799; Aphodius (Bodilus) arvernicus Hoffmann, 1928; Aphodius immundus fulvicollis Mulsant, 1842; Aphodius immundus melinopleurus Mulsant, 1842

= Acanthobodilus immundus =

Species of beetle

Acanthobodilus immundus is a species of beetle of the family Scarabaeidae. It is found in Afghanistan, Albania, Armenia, Austria, Azerbaijan, Belarus, Belgium, Bosnia and Herzegovina, Bulgaria, China (Sichuan), Croatia, Cyprus, the Czech Republic, Denmark, Egypt, Estonia, France, Georgia, Germany, Greece, Hungary, Iran, Iraq, Italy, Kazakhstan, Kyrgyzstan, Latvia, Lithuania, Macedonia, Mongolia, Montenegro, Morocco, Poland, Portugal, Romania, Russia, Serbia, Slovakia, Spain, Sweden, Switzerland, Syria, Tajikistan, Turkey, Turkmenistan and Ukraine.

== Description ==
Adults reach a length of about 5–6 mm (0.20–0.24 in). They have an elongate-oval, somewhat convex, rather dull, glabrous, yellowish body, mostly with the disc of the pronotum and two lateral spots brownish, and with the elytral suture darker.
