= Acanthobodilus languidulus =

Scientific classification
- Kingdom: Animalia
- Phylum: Arthropoda
- Clade: Pancrustacea
- Class: Insecta
- Order: Coleoptera
- Suborder: Polyphaga
- Infraorder: Scarabaeiformia
- Family: Scarabaeidae
- Genus: Acanthobodilus
- Species: A. languidulus

Binomial name
- Acanthobodilus languidulus (Schmidt, 1917)

Synonyms
- Aphodius languidulus Schmidt, 1917; Aphodius obsoletus Waterhouse, 1875

Species of beetle

Acanthobodilus languidulus is a species of beetle of the family Scarabaeidae. It is found in China (Beijing, Gansu, Ningxia, Qinghai, Sichuan, Shanghai, Xinjiang, Xizang, Yunnan), Japan, North Korea, South Korea, the Russian Far East and Taiwan.

== Description ==
Adults reach a length of about 5–6 mm (0.20–0.24 in). They have an oval, weakly shiny, yellowish brown body, with the head, prothorax and elytral sutures reddish-brown to dark brown.
