= Acanthobodilus =

Scientific classification
- Kingdom: Animalia
- Phylum: Arthropoda
- Clade: Pancrustacea
- Class: Insecta
- Order: Coleoptera
- Suborder: Polyphaga
- Infraorder: Scarabaeiformia
- Family: Scarabaeidae
- Subfamily: Aphodiinae
- Tribe: Aphodiini
- Genus: Acanthobodilus; Dellacasa, 1983

Synonyms
- Aphodius (Acanthobodilus) Dellacasa, 1983

Genus of beetles

Acanthobodilus is a genus of beetles of the family Scarabaeidae.

== Species ==
- Acanthobodilus immundus (Creutzer, 1799)
- Acanthobodilus languidulus (Schmidt, 1917)
