= Orodaliscus zangi =

Scientific classification
- Kingdom: Animalia
- Phylum: Arthropoda
- Clade: Pancrustacea
- Class: Insecta
- Order: Coleoptera
- Suborder: Polyphaga
- Infraorder: Scarabaeiformia
- Family: Scarabaeidae
- Genus: Orodaliscus
- Species: O. zangi

Binomial name
- Orodaliscus zangi (Schmidt, 1906)

Synonyms
- Aphodius (Amidorus) zangi Schmidt, 1906; Aphodius (Orodaliscus) jureceki Balthasar, 1932

Species of beetle

Orodaliscus zangi is a species of beetle of the family Scarabaeidae. It is found in China (Xinjiang), Kazakhstan, Kyrgyzstan, Russia (including Siberia) and Ukraine.

== Description ==
Adults reach a length of about 4.5–5.5 mm (0.18–0.22 in). They have a quite strongly convex, shiny, glabrous body. The forebody is black, with the sides of the pronotum yellow. The elytra are light reddish-brown to yellowish-red, with the sutural margin blackened. The legs are light brown.
