= Orodaliscus angulatulus =

Scientific classification
- Kingdom: Animalia
- Phylum: Arthropoda
- Clade: Pancrustacea
- Class: Insecta
- Order: Coleoptera
- Suborder: Polyphaga
- Infraorder: Scarabaeiformia
- Family: Scarabaeidae
- Genus: Orodaliscus
- Species: O. angulatulus

Binomial name
- Orodaliscus angulatulus (Schmidt, 1917)

Synonyms
- Aphodius angulatulus Schmidt, 1917; Aphodius (Orodaliscus) ghilarovi Medvedev, 1968; Aphodius angulatus Schmidt, 1907; Ammoecius discolor Solsky, 1876

Species of beetle

Orodaliscus angulatulus is a species of beetle of the family Scarabaeidae. It is found in Uzbekistan.

== Description ==
Adults reach a length of about 6–7 mm (0.24–0.28 in). They have a fairly parallel-sided, shiny, glabrous, black body, with the elytra reddish-brown.
