= Orodaliscus rotundangulus =

Scientific classification
- Kingdom: Animalia
- Phylum: Arthropoda
- Clade: Pancrustacea
- Class: Insecta
- Order: Coleoptera
- Suborder: Polyphaga
- Infraorder: Scarabaeiformia
- Family: Scarabaeidae
- Genus: Orodaliscus
- Species: O. rotundangulus

Binomial name
- Orodaliscus rotundangulus (Reitter, 1900)

Synonyms
- Aphodius (Orodaliscus) rotundangulus Reitter, 1900; Aphodius (Mendidaphodius) makolskii Roubal, 1936; Aphodius (Mendidaphodius) batesoni Semenov & Medvedev, 1928; Aphodius (Orodalus) fortimargo Reitter, 1907

Species of beetle

Orodaliscus rotundangulus is a species of beetle of the family Scarabaeidae. It is found in Bulgaria, China (Xinjiang), Kazakhstan, Kyrgyzstan, Poland, Romania, Russia and Ukraine.

== Description ==
Adults reach a length of about 5–7 mm (0.20–0.28 in). They have an oval-elongate, moderately convex, shiny, glabrous, piceous body. The margin of the clypeus and the front angles of the pronotum are reddish, and the elytra are dark red.
