= Orodaliscus =

Scientific classification
- Kingdom: Animalia
- Phylum: Arthropoda
- Clade: Pancrustacea
- Class: Insecta
- Order: Coleoptera
- Suborder: Polyphaga
- Infraorder: Scarabaeiformia
- Family: Scarabaeidae
- Subfamily: Aphodiinae
- Tribe: Aphodiini
- Genus: Orodaliscus; Reitter, 1900

Synonyms
- Aphodius (Orodaliscus) Reitter, 1900

Genus of beetles

Orodaliscus is a genus of beetles of the family Scarabaeidae.

== Species ==
- Orodaliscus angulatulus (Schmidt, 1917)
- Orodaliscus rotundangulus (Reitter, 1900)
- Orodaliscus spalacophilus (Novikov, 1996)
- Orodaliscus transaralicus (Nikolajev, 1983)
- Orodaliscus zangi (Schmidt, 1906)
