= Cnemisus kozlovi =

Scientific classification
- Kingdom: Animalia
- Phylum: Arthropoda
- Clade: Pancrustacea
- Class: Insecta
- Order: Coleoptera
- Suborder: Polyphaga
- Infraorder: Scarabaeiformia
- Family: Scarabaeidae
- Genus: Cnemisus
- Species: C. kozlovi

Binomial name
- Cnemisus kozlovi (Semenov, 1903)

Synonyms
- Ahermes kozlovi Semenov, 1903

Species of beetle

Cnemisus kozlovi is a species of beetle of the family Scarabaeidae. It is found in China (Nei Mongol).

== Description ==
Adults reach a length of about 9.5–11.5 mm (0.37–0.45 in). The upper surface is light reddish-brown, glossy and glabrous.
