= Cnemisus =

Scientific classification
- Kingdom: Animalia
- Phylum: Arthropoda
- Clade: Pancrustacea
- Class: Insecta
- Order: Coleoptera
- Suborder: Polyphaga
- Infraorder: Scarabaeiformia
- Family: Scarabaeidae
- Subfamily: Aphodiinae
- Tribe: Aphodiini
- Genus: Cnemisus; Motschulsky, 1868

Synonyms
- Ahermes Reitter, 1891; Cnemargus Motschulsky, 1845

Genus of beetles

Cnemisus is a genus of beetles of the family Scarabaeidae.

== Species ==
- Cnemisus ahngeri (Semenov, 1903)
- Cnemisus kaznakovi (Semenov, 1903)
- Cnemisus kozlovi (Semenov, 1903)
- Cnemisus rufescens (Motschulsky, 1845)
