= Cnemisus rufescens =

Scientific classification
- Kingdom: Animalia
- Phylum: Arthropoda
- Clade: Pancrustacea
- Class: Insecta
- Order: Coleoptera
- Suborder: Polyphaga
- Infraorder: Scarabaeiformia
- Family: Scarabaeidae
- Genus: Cnemisus
- Species: C. rufescens

Binomial name
- Cnemisus rufescens (Motschulsky, 1845)

Synonyms
- Cnemargus rufescens Motschulsky, 1845; Mendidius rufescens Reitter, 1888

Species of beetle

Cnemisus rufescens is a species of beetle of the family Scarabaeidae. It is found in Kazakhstan, Kyrgyzstan and southern Russia.

== Description ==
Adults reach a length of about 7–9 mm (0.28–0.35 in). They have a subparallel, convex, shiny, nearly glabrous, reddish body, with the head, pronotum and legs somewhat darker.
