= Cnemisus kaznakovi =

Scientific classification
- Kingdom: Animalia
- Phylum: Arthropoda
- Clade: Pancrustacea
- Class: Insecta
- Order: Coleoptera
- Suborder: Polyphaga
- Infraorder: Scarabaeiformia
- Family: Scarabaeidae
- Genus: Cnemisus
- Species: C. kaznakovi

Binomial name
- Cnemisus kaznakovi (Semenov, 1903)

Synonyms
- Ahermes kaznakovi Semenov, 1903; Cnemisus kaszabi Endrödi, 1964

Species of beetle

Cnemisus kaznakovi is a species of beetle of the family Scarabaeidae. It is found in China (Nei Mongol) and Mongolia.

== Description ==
Adults reach a length of about 6.5–8 mm (0.26–0.31 in). The upper surface is light reddish-brown, glossy and glabrous.
