= Cnemisus ahngeri =

Scientific classification
- Kingdom: Animalia
- Phylum: Arthropoda
- Clade: Pancrustacea
- Class: Insecta
- Order: Coleoptera
- Suborder: Polyphaga
- Infraorder: Scarabaeiformia
- Family: Scarabaeidae
- Genus: Cnemisus
- Species: C. ahngeri

Binomial name
- Cnemisus ahngeri (Semenov, 1903)

Synonyms
- Ahermes ahngeri Semenov, 1903

Species of beetle

Cnemisus ahngeri is a species of beetle of the family Scarabaeidae. It is found in Turkmenistan and Uzbekistan.

== Description ==
Adults reach a length of about 9.2 mm (0.36 in). The upper surface is light reddish-brown, glossy and glabrous. The head is rather short and broad.
