= Harmogaster tuberculata =

Scientific classification
- Kingdom: Animalia
- Phylum: Arthropoda
- Clade: Pancrustacea
- Class: Insecta
- Order: Coleoptera
- Suborder: Polyphaga
- Infraorder: Scarabaeiformia
- Family: Scarabaeidae
- Genus: Harmogaster
- Species: H. tuberculata

Binomial name
- Harmogaster tuberculata Endrödi, 1991

Species of beetle

Harmogaster tuberculata is a species of beetle of the family Scarabaeidae. It is found in South Africa (Western Cape).

== Description ==
Adults reach a length of about 4.5 mm (0.18 in). They have a shiny, glabrous body, with black antennae and dark reddish-brown legs.

== Life history ==
Specimens have been collected from elephant dung.
