= Harmogaster exarata =

Scientific classification
- Kingdom: Animalia
- Phylum: Arthropoda
- Clade: Pancrustacea
- Class: Insecta
- Order: Coleoptera
- Suborder: Polyphaga
- Infraorder: Scarabaeiformia
- Family: Scarabaeidae
- Genus: Harmogaster
- Species: H. exarata

Binomial name
- Harmogaster exarata Harold, 1861

Synonyms
- Aphodius (Ammoecius) cribripennis Petrovitz, 1964; Odontaphodius tenebrioides Schmidt, 1907; Aphodius exarata Dejean, 1833

Species of beetle

Harmogaster exarata is a species of beetle of the family Scarabaeidae. It is found in South Africa (Cape).

== Description ==
Adults reach a length of about 4–6 mm (0.16–0.24 in). They have an elongate, strongly convex, shiny, glabrous, brown-blackish body, with the clypeus, anterior angles of the pronotum and sometimes also the elytra paler.
