= Harmogaster quadridentella =

Scientific classification
- Kingdom: Animalia
- Phylum: Arthropoda
- Clade: Pancrustacea
- Class: Insecta
- Order: Coleoptera
- Suborder: Polyphaga
- Infraorder: Scarabaeiformia
- Family: Scarabaeidae
- Genus: Harmogaster
- Species: H. quadridentella

Binomial name
- Harmogaster quadridentella Schmidt, 1910

Species of beetle

Harmogaster quadridentella is a species of beetle of the family Scarabaeidae. It is found in South Africa (Western Cape).

== Description ==
Adults reach a length of about 4 mm (0.16 in). They have a slightly glossy, black body, with the elytra dark reddish-brown. The surface is covered with short, yellowish hairs.
