= Harmogaster sulcatula =

Scientific classification
- Kingdom: Animalia
- Phylum: Arthropoda
- Clade: Pancrustacea
- Class: Insecta
- Order: Coleoptera
- Suborder: Polyphaga
- Infraorder: Scarabaeiformia
- Family: Scarabaeidae
- Genus: Harmogaster
- Species: H. sulcatula

Binomial name
- Harmogaster sulcatula Schmidt, 1910

Species of beetle

Harmogaster sulcatula is a species of beetle of the family Scarabaeidae. It is found in South Africa (KwaZulu-Natal).

== Description ==
Adults reach a length of about 5 mm (0.20 in). They have a shiny, convex, black body.
