= Harmogaster =

Scientific classification
- Kingdom: Animalia
- Phylum: Arthropoda
- Clade: Pancrustacea
- Class: Insecta
- Order: Coleoptera
- Suborder: Polyphaga
- Infraorder: Scarabaeiformia
- Family: Scarabaeidae
- Subfamily: Aphodiinae
- Tribe: Aphodiini
- Genus: Harmogaster; Harold, 1861

Synonyms
- Odontaphodius Schmidt, 1907

Genus of beetles

Harmogaster is a genus of beetles of the family Scarabaeidae.

== Species ==
- Harmogaster exarata Harold, 1861
- Harmogaster quadridentella Schmidt, 1910
- Harmogaster sulcatula Schmidt, 1910
- Harmogaster transitoria Péringuey, 1901
- Harmogaster tuberculata Endrödi, 1991
