= Pseudoxyomus =

Scientific classification
- Kingdom: Animalia
- Phylum: Arthropoda
- Clade: Pancrustacea
- Class: Insecta
- Order: Coleoptera
- Suborder: Polyphaga
- Infraorder: Scarabaeiformia
- Family: Scarabaeidae
- Subfamily: Aphodiinae
- Tribe: Aphodiini
- Genus: Pseudoxyomus; Petrovitz, 1962

Genus of beetles

Pseudoxyomus is a genus of beetles of the family Scarabaeidae.

== Species ==
- Pseudoxyomus armaticeps (Péringuey, 1901)
- Pseudoxyomus cochraneae (Bordat, 1996)
- Pseudoxyomus davisi (Bordat, 1996)
- Pseudoxyomus eximius (Péringuey, 1901)
- Pseudoxyomus geminata (Schmidt, 1910)
- Pseudoxyomus intrusus (Péringuey, 1901)
- Pseudoxyomus maniculus (Petrovitz, 1961)
- Pseudoxyomus oblongopunctata (Balthasar, 1941)
- Pseudoxyomus opaculus (Harold, 1869)
- Pseudoxyomus opatroides (Balthasar, 1941)
- Pseudoxyomus rubescens Petrovitz, 1962
- Pseudoxyomus scobina (Petrovitz, 1956)
- Pseudoxyomus setosus (Petrovitz, 1964)
- Pseudoxyomus strydomi (Endrödi, 1976)
