= Pseudoxyomus geminata =

Scientific classification
- Kingdom: Animalia
- Phylum: Arthropoda
- Clade: Pancrustacea
- Class: Insecta
- Order: Coleoptera
- Suborder: Polyphaga
- Infraorder: Scarabaeiformia
- Family: Scarabaeidae
- Genus: Pseudoxyomus
- Species: P. geminata

Binomial name
- Pseudoxyomus geminata (Schmidt, 1910)

Synonyms
- Harmogaster geminata Schmidt, 1910

Species of beetle

Pseudoxyomus geminata is a species of beetle of the family Scarabaeidae. It is found in South Africa (Transvaal, Cape, KwaZulu-Natal) and was introduced to Australia (New South Wales, Queensland, South Australia).

== Description ==
Adults reach a length of about 4.2–4.8 mm (0.17–0.19 in). They have an elongate-oval, shining, black body, with the legs reddish-brown, and sometimes with the elytra lighter than the head and pronotum.
