= Pseudoxyomus armaticeps =

Scientific classification
- Kingdom: Animalia
- Phylum: Arthropoda
- Clade: Pancrustacea
- Class: Insecta
- Order: Coleoptera
- Suborder: Polyphaga
- Infraorder: Scarabaeiformia
- Family: Scarabaeidae
- Genus: Pseudoxyomus
- Species: P. armaticeps

Binomial name
- Pseudoxyomus armaticeps (Péringuey, 1901)

Synonyms
- Aphodius (Ammoecius) armaticeps Péringuey, 1901

Species of beetle

Pseudoxyomus armaticeps is a species of beetle of the family Scarabaeidae. It is found in South Africa (Eastern Cape).
