= Pseudoxyomus rubescens =

Scientific classification
- Kingdom: Animalia
- Phylum: Arthropoda
- Clade: Pancrustacea
- Class: Insecta
- Order: Coleoptera
- Suborder: Polyphaga
- Infraorder: Scarabaeiformia
- Family: Scarabaeidae
- Genus: Pseudoxyomus
- Species: P. rubescens

Binomial name
- Pseudoxyomus rubescens Petrovitz, 1962

Species of beetle

Pseudoxyomus rubescens is a species of beetle of the family Scarabaeidae. It is found in South Africa (Cape, Transvaal).

== Description ==
Adults reach a length of about 3–4 mm (0.12–0.16 in). They have an oval-elongate, strongly convex, dull, glabrous, dark brown-blackish body.
