= Eudolus quadriguttatus =

Scientific classification
- Kingdom: Animalia
- Phylum: Arthropoda
- Clade: Pancrustacea
- Class: Insecta
- Order: Coleoptera
- Suborder: Polyphaga
- Infraorder: Scarabaeiformia
- Family: Scarabaeidae
- Genus: Eudolus
- Species: E. quadriguttatus

Binomial name
- Eudolus quadriguttatus (Herbst, 1783)

Synonyms
- Scarabaeus quadriguttatus Herbst, 1783; Aphodius (Esymus) joliveti Baraud, 1980; Aphodius (Volinus) jaczewskii Balthasar, 1938; Aphodius (Calamosternus) quadriguttatus dilutus Fiori, 1907; Aphodius quadriguttatus nigrosuturalis Müller, 1902; Aphodius quadriguttatus astaurus Fuente, 1897; Aphodius quadriguttatus angularis Mulsant, 1842; Aphodius quadriguttatus cruciatus Mulsant, 1842; Aphodius quadripustulatus Duftschmid, 1805; Scarabaeus quadrimaculatus Fabricius, 1775

Species of beetle

Eudolus quadriguttatus is a species of beetle of the family Scarabaeidae. It is found in Afghanistan, Albania, Algeria, Armenia, Austria, Belarus, Belgium, Bosnia and Herzegovina, Bulgaria, China, Croatia, Cyprus, the Czech Republic, Denmark, Egypt, France, Georgia, Germany, Greece, Hungary, Iran, Iraq, Israel, Italy, Jordan, Kazakhstan, Kyrgyzstan, Latvia, Libya, Lithuania, Malta, Montenegro, Morocco, the Netherlands, Poland, Portugal, Romania, Russia, Serbia, Slovakia, Spain, Sweden, Switzerland, Syria, Tajikistan, Tunisia, Turkey, Turkmenistan, Ukraine and Uzbekistan.

== Description ==
Adults reach a length of about 3–5 mm (0.12–0.20 in). They have an oval-elongate, moderately convex, shiny, glabrous body. The head is blackish and the pronotum is black with a reddish lateral margin. The elytra are blackish, but bright orange apically and with two orange spots.
