= Eudolus quadrinaevulus =

Scientific classification
- Kingdom: Animalia
- Phylum: Arthropoda
- Clade: Pancrustacea
- Class: Insecta
- Order: Coleoptera
- Suborder: Polyphaga
- Infraorder: Scarabaeiformia
- Family: Scarabaeidae
- Genus: Eudolus
- Species: E. quadrinaevulus

Binomial name
- Eudolus quadrinaevulus (Reitter, 1892)

Synonyms
- Aphodius (Orodalus) quadrinaevulus Reitter, 1892

Species of beetle

Eudolus quadrinaevulus is a species of beetle of the family Scarabaeidae. It is found in Armenia, Azerbaijan, Greece, Iran and Turkey.

== Description ==
Adults reach a length of about 3.8–5 mm (0.15–0.20 in). They have a moderately glossy, dark brown body, with yellow spots on the elytra. The legs are dark brown.
