= Eudolus =

Scientific classification
- Kingdom: Animalia
- Phylum: Arthropoda
- Clade: Pancrustacea
- Class: Insecta
- Order: Coleoptera
- Suborder: Polyphaga
- Infraorder: Scarabaeiformia
- Family: Scarabaeidae
- Subfamily: Aphodiinae
- Tribe: Aphodiini
- Genus: Eudolus; Mulsant & Rey, 1870

Synonyms
- Aphodius (Eudolus) Mulsant & Rey, 1870

Genus of beetles

Eudolus is a genus of beetles of the family Scarabaeidae.

== Species ==
- Eudolus quadriguttatus (Herbst, 1783)
- Eudolus quadrinaevulus (Reitter, 1892)
