= Paradeloparius brincki =

Scientific classification
- Kingdom: Animalia
- Phylum: Arthropoda
- Clade: Pancrustacea
- Class: Insecta
- Order: Coleoptera
- Suborder: Polyphaga
- Infraorder: Scarabaeiformia
- Family: Scarabaeidae
- Genus: Paradeloparius
- Species: P. brincki

Binomial name
- Paradeloparius brincki (Landin, 1959)

Synonyms
- Aphodius (Paradeloparius) brincki Landin, 1959

Species of beetle

Paradeloparius brincki is a species of beetle of the family Scarabaeidae. It is found in Tanzania.

== Description ==
Adults reach a length of about 13.5–16 mm (0.53–0.63 in). They have a moderately shining, deep black or sometimes black-brownish body, with the head usually dark brown anteriorly and laterally. The lateral margins of the pronotum are usually dark red-brownish and the underside, legs and antennae are brownish.

== Etymology ==
The species is named in honour of Professor Per Brinck.
