= Paradeloparius =

- Paradeloparius circumdatus

Scientific classification
- Kingdom: Animalia
- Phylum: Arthropoda
- Clade: Pancrustacea
- Class: Insecta
- Order: Coleoptera
- Suborder: Polyphaga
- Infraorder: Scarabaeiformia
- Family: Scarabaeidae
- Subfamily: Aphodiinae
- Tribe: Aphodiini
- Genus: Paradeloparius; Landin, 1959

Synonyms
- Aphodius (Paradeloparius) Landin, 1959

Genus of beetles

Paradeloparius is a genus of beetles of the family Scarabaeidae.

== Species ==
- Paradeloparius brincki (Landin, 1959)
- Paradeloparius cavicollis (Endrödi, 1964)
- Paradeloparius circumdatus (Klug, 1855)
- Paradeloparius emeritus (Péringuey, 1901)
