= Paradeloparius emeritus =

Scientific classification
- Kingdom: Animalia
- Phylum: Arthropoda
- Clade: Pancrustacea
- Class: Insecta
- Order: Coleoptera
- Suborder: Polyphaga
- Infraorder: Scarabaeiformia
- Family: Scarabaeidae
- Genus: Paradeloparius
- Species: P. emeritus

Binomial name
- Paradeloparius emeritus (Péringuey, 1901)

Synonyms
- Aphodius emeritus Péringuey, 1901; Aphodius (Adeloparius) excavaticollis Balthasar, 1939

Species of beetle

Paradeloparius emeritus is a species of beetle of the family Scarabaeidae. It is found in Zimbabwe.

== Description ==
Adults reach a length of about 12–14 mm (0.47–0.55 in). They have a glabrous, reddish-brown body, with the lateral part of the prothorax and also of the elytra somewhat testaceous or lighter brown. The antennae are brownish-red.
