= Paradeloparius circumdatus =

Scientific classification
- Kingdom: Animalia
- Phylum: Arthropoda
- Clade: Pancrustacea
- Class: Insecta
- Order: Coleoptera
- Suborder: Polyphaga
- Infraorder: Scarabaeiformia
- Family: Scarabaeidae
- Genus: Paradeloparius
- Species: P. circumdatus

Binomial name
- Paradeloparius circumdatus (Klug, 1855)

Synonyms
- Aphodius circumdatus Klug, 1855; Aphodius valens Péringuey, 1901

Species of beetle

Paradeloparius circumdatus is a species of beetle of the family Scarabaeidae. It is found in Angola, Kenya, Mozambique and the Democratic Republic of the Congo.

== Description ==
Adults reach a length of about 10–17 mm (0.39–0.67 in). They have a widely oval, moderately convex, shiny, glabrous, dark brownish body, with the head, sides of the pronotum, and the apex and lateral margins of the elytra reddish.
