= Basilewskyanus elisabethae =

Scientific classification
- Kingdom: Animalia
- Phylum: Arthropoda
- Clade: Pancrustacea
- Class: Insecta
- Order: Coleoptera
- Suborder: Polyphaga
- Infraorder: Scarabaeiformia
- Family: Scarabaeidae
- Genus: Basilewskyanus
- Species: B. elisabethae

Binomial name
- Basilewskyanus elisabethae (Endrödi, 1956)

Synonyms
- Aphodius (Basilewskyanus) elisabethae Endrödi, 1956

Species of beetle

Basilewskyanus elisabethae is a species of beetle of the family Scarabaeidae. It is found in Angola, the Democratic Republic of the Congo and Zambia.

== Description ==
Adults reach a length of about 6–8 mm (0.24–0.31 in). They have an elongate, convex, shiny, glabrous, testaceous body, with the disc of the pronotum, sides of the scutellum, as well as the suture and elytral striae darker. The legs are brown-reddish.
