= Basilewskyanus insignis =

Scientific classification
- Kingdom: Animalia
- Phylum: Arthropoda
- Clade: Pancrustacea
- Class: Insecta
- Order: Coleoptera
- Suborder: Polyphaga
- Infraorder: Scarabaeiformia
- Family: Scarabaeidae
- Genus: Basilewskyanus
- Species: B. insignis

Binomial name
- Basilewskyanus insignis (Schmidt, 1910)

Synonyms
- Aphodius insignis Schmidt, 1910

Species of beetle

Basilewskyanus insignis is a species of beetle of the family Scarabaeidae. It is found in Guinea-Bissau, Niger and Senegal.

== Description ==
Adults reach a length of about 7 mm (0.28 in). They have an oblong, convex, yellowish-brown body, with the head, disc, scutellum and sutural margin of the thorax blackish.
