= Basilewskyanus =

Scientific classification
- Kingdom: Animalia
- Phylum: Arthropoda
- Clade: Pancrustacea
- Class: Insecta
- Order: Coleoptera
- Suborder: Polyphaga
- Infraorder: Scarabaeiformia
- Family: Scarabaeidae
- Subfamily: Aphodiinae
- Tribe: Aphodiini
- Genus: Basilewskyanus; Endrödi, 1956

Synonyms
- Aphodius (Basilewskyanus) Endrödi, 1956

Genus of beetles

Basilewskyanus is a genus of beetles of the family Scarabaeidae.

== Species ==
- Basilewskyanus elisabethae (Endrödi, 1956)
- Basilewskyanus insignis (Schmidt, 1910)
- Basilewskyanus iridescens (Péringuey, 1901)
