= Basilewskyanus iridescens =

Scientific classification
- Kingdom: Animalia
- Phylum: Arthropoda
- Clade: Pancrustacea
- Class: Insecta
- Order: Coleoptera
- Suborder: Polyphaga
- Infraorder: Scarabaeiformia
- Family: Scarabaeidae
- Genus: Basilewskyanus
- Species: B. iridescens

Binomial name
- Basilewskyanus iridescens (Péringuey, 1901)

Synonyms
- Aphodius iridescens Péringuey, 1901; Aphodius (Nialus) fingo Petrovitz, 1971

Species of beetle

Basilewskyanus iridescens is a species of beetle of the family Scarabaeidae. It is found in South Africa (KwaZulu-Natal).

== Description ==
Adults reach a length of about 8 mm (0.31 in). They have a very light, somewhat flavescent-bronze, glabrous body, with the head, prothorax (except for a broad marginal band), a transverse basal band on the elytra and a less defined one in the posterior part on each side, and also the sutural part, greenish blue and iridescent. The underside is glabrous and darker bronze. The antennae are somewhat rufescent.
