= Sitiphus brevitarsis =

Scientific classification
- Kingdom: Animalia
- Phylum: Arthropoda
- Clade: Pancrustacea
- Class: Insecta
- Order: Coleoptera
- Suborder: Polyphaga
- Infraorder: Scarabaeiformia
- Family: Scarabaeidae
- Genus: Sitiphus
- Species: S. brevitarsis

Binomial name
- Sitiphus brevitarsis (Reitter, 1894)

Synonyms
- Aphodius (Mendidius) brevitarsis Reitter, 1894; Sitiphus brisouti Fairmaire, 1894

Species of beetle

Sitiphus brevitarsis is a species of beetle of the family Scarabaeidae. It is found in Algeria, Morocco and Tunisia.

== Description ==
Adults reach a length of about 3–4.5 mm (0.12–0.18 in). They have an oval, strongly convex, shiny, glabrous, testaceous body, with the head, pronotum, scutellum and elytral suture darker.
