= Sitiphus sefrensis =

Scientific classification
- Kingdom: Animalia
- Phylum: Arthropoda
- Clade: Pancrustacea
- Class: Insecta
- Order: Coleoptera
- Suborder: Polyphaga
- Infraorder: Scarabaeiformia
- Family: Scarabaeidae
- Genus: Sitiphus
- Species: S. sefrensis

Binomial name
- Sitiphus sefrensis (Petrovitz, 1958)

Synonyms
- Aphodius (Sitiphus) sefrensis Petrovitz, 1958

Species of beetle

Sitiphus sefrensis is a species of beetle of the family Scarabaeidae. It is found in Algeria, Morocco, Tunisia and the Sahara.

== Description ==
Adults reach a length of about 6.2 mm (0.24 in). They have a short, strongly convex, glossy body. The head, pronotum, scutellum and the elytral suture are dark brown, while the elytra and legs are lighter brown.
