= Sitiphus =

Scientific classification
- Kingdom: Animalia
- Phylum: Arthropoda
- Clade: Pancrustacea
- Class: Insecta
- Order: Coleoptera
- Suborder: Polyphaga
- Infraorder: Scarabaeiformia
- Family: Scarabaeidae
- Subfamily: Aphodiinae
- Tribe: Aphodiini
- Genus: Sitiphus; Fairmaire, 1894

Genus of beetles

Sitiphus is a genus of beetles of the family Scarabaeidae.

== Species ==
- Sitiphus ammodites (Peyerimhoff, 1939)
- Sitiphus brevitarsis (Reitter, 1894)
- Sitiphus sefrensis (Petrovitz, 1958)
