= Sitiphus ammodites =

Scientific classification
- Kingdom: Animalia
- Phylum: Arthropoda
- Clade: Pancrustacea
- Class: Insecta
- Order: Coleoptera
- Suborder: Polyphaga
- Infraorder: Scarabaeiformia
- Family: Scarabaeidae
- Genus: Sitiphus
- Species: S. ammodites

Binomial name
- Sitiphus ammodites (Peyerimhoff, 1939)

Synonyms
- Aphodius (Sitiphus) ammodites Peyerimhoff, 1939

Species of beetle

Sitiphus ammodites is a species of beetle of the family Scarabaeidae. It is found in Algeria, Tunisia and the Sahara.

== Description ==
Adults reach a length of about 4.5 mm (0.18 in). They have an elongately-oval, strongly convex, shiny, smooth, entirely brown body. They are wingless.
