= Megateloides =

Scientific classification
- Kingdom: Animalia
- Phylum: Arthropoda
- Clade: Pancrustacea
- Class: Insecta
- Order: Coleoptera
- Suborder: Polyphaga
- Infraorder: Scarabaeiformia
- Family: Scarabaeidae
- Subfamily: Aphodiinae
- Tribe: Aphodiini
- Genus: Megateloides; Landin, 1974

Synonyms
- Colobopterus (Megateloides) Landin, 1974

Genus of beetles

Megateloides is a genus of beetles of the family Scarabaeidae.

== Species ==
- Megateloides bostrichoides (Harold, 1860)
- Megateloides dimidiatus (Roth, 1851)
