= Megateloides dimidiatus =

Scientific classification
- Kingdom: Animalia
- Phylum: Arthropoda
- Clade: Pancrustacea
- Class: Insecta
- Order: Coleoptera
- Suborder: Polyphaga
- Infraorder: Scarabaeiformia
- Family: Scarabaeidae
- Genus: Megateloides
- Species: M. dimidiatus

Binomial name
- Megateloides dimidiatus (Roth, 1851)

Synonyms
- Aphodius dimidiatus Roth, 1851; Aphodius (Megatelus) diadimitus Petrovitz, 1962

Species of beetle

Megateloides dimidiatus is a species of beetle of the family Scarabaeidae. It is found in Angola, Benin, Burkina Faso, Cameroon, Chad, Ethiopia, Ivory Coast, Niger, Nigeria, the Democratic Republic of the Congo, South Africa, Senegal, Zambia and Zimbabwe.

== Description ==
Adults reach a length of about 3–4 mm (0.12–0.16 in). They have a short, subcylindrical, shiny, glabrous, blackish body. The margin of the clypeus and the sides of the pronotum are reddish and the apical third of the elytra is also reddish.

== Subspecies ==
- Megateloides dimidiatus dimidiatus (Angola, Benin, Burkina Faso, Cameroon, Chad, Ethiopia, Ivory Coast, Niger, Nigeria, the Democratic Republic of the Congo, South Africa, Senegal, Zambia, Zimbabwe)
- Megateloides dimidiatus diadimitus (Petrovitz, 1962) (Cameroon, Nigeria, Senegal)
