= Megateloides bostrichoides =

Scientific classification
- Kingdom: Animalia
- Phylum: Arthropoda
- Clade: Pancrustacea
- Class: Insecta
- Order: Coleoptera
- Suborder: Polyphaga
- Infraorder: Scarabaeiformia
- Family: Scarabaeidae
- Genus: Megateloides
- Species: M. bostrichoides

Binomial name
- Megateloides bostrichoides (Harold, 1860)

Synonyms
- Aphodius bostrichoides Harold, 1860

Species of beetle

Megateloides bostrichoides is a species of beetle of the family Scarabaeidae. It is found in India, Laos, Myanmar, Thailand and Vietnam.

== Description ==
Adults reach a length of about 3.5–4 mm (0.14–0.16 in). They have a moderately convex, glossy, black body, the pronotum with a reddish spot on the sides. The elytra are yellow, with a large, black spot.
