= Neocolobopterus abyssinicus =

Scientific classification
- Kingdom: Animalia
- Phylum: Arthropoda
- Clade: Pancrustacea
- Class: Insecta
- Order: Coleoptera
- Suborder: Polyphaga
- Infraorder: Scarabaeiformia
- Family: Scarabaeidae
- Genus: Neocolobopterus
- Species: N. abyssinicus

Binomial name
- Neocolobopterus abyssinicus (Harold, 1861)

Synonyms
- Aphodius abyssinicus Harold, 1861

Species of beetle

Neocolobopterus abyssinicus is a species of beetle of the family Scarabaeidae. It is found in Ethiopia.

== Description ==
Adults reach a length of about 7–8 mm (0.28–0.31 in). They have an oblong, convex, longitudinally flattened, moderately shiny, glabrous, blackish body. The front angles of the pronotum are reddish and sometimes the sides are yellowish. The elytra are brown-yellowish.
