= Neocolobopterus =

- Neocolobopterus marginicollis

Scientific classification
- Kingdom: Animalia
- Phylum: Arthropoda
- Clade: Pancrustacea
- Class: Insecta
- Order: Coleoptera
- Suborder: Polyphaga
- Infraorder: Scarabaeiformia
- Family: Scarabaeidae
- Subfamily: Aphodiinae
- Tribe: Aphodiini
- Genus: Neocolobopterus; Landin, 1974

Synonyms
- Colobopterus (Neocolobopterus) Landin, 1974

Genus of beetles

Neocolobopterus is a genus of beetles of the family Scarabaeidae.

== Species ==
- Neocolobopterus abyssinicus (Harold, 1861)
- Neocolobopterus ballioni (Schmidt, 1906)
- Neocolobopterus kivuanus (Endrödi, 1956)
- Neocolobopterus maculicollis (Reiche, 1850)
- Neocolobopterus marginicollis (Harold, 1859)
- Neocolobopterus spangleri (Dellacasa, 1990)
- Neocolobopterus stefenelli (Dellacasa, 1984)
