= Neocolobopterus marginicollis =

Scientific classification
- Kingdom: Animalia
- Phylum: Arthropoda
- Clade: Pancrustacea
- Class: Insecta
- Order: Coleoptera
- Suborder: Polyphaga
- Infraorder: Scarabaeiformia
- Family: Scarabaeidae
- Genus: Neocolobopterus
- Species: N. marginicollis

Binomial name
- Neocolobopterus marginicollis (Harold, 1859)

Synonyms
- Colobopterus marginicollis Harold, 1859; Aphodius marginicollis Dejean, 1833

Species of beetle

Neocolobopterus marginicollis is a species of beetle of the family Scarabaeidae. It is found in South Africa (Cape).

== Description ==
Adults reach a length of about 7.5–8 mm (0.30–0.31 in). They have a somewhat shining and sparsely pubescent on the upper part. The head is black or deep fuscous and the prothorax is black, edged with a very broad flavescent lateral margin. The elytra are brown with the sides somewhat pale testaceous.
