= Sinodiapterna troitzkyi =

Scientific classification
- Kingdom: Animalia
- Phylum: Arthropoda
- Clade: Pancrustacea
- Class: Insecta
- Order: Coleoptera
- Suborder: Polyphaga
- Infraorder: Scarabaeiformia
- Family: Scarabaeidae
- Genus: Sinodiapterna
- Species: S. troitzkyi

Binomial name
- Sinodiapterna troitzkyi (Jacobson, 1897)

Synonyms
- Aphodius (Teuchestes) troitzkyi Jacobson, 1897; Aphodius (Teuchestes) donghariensis Stebnicka, 1973

Species of beetle

Sinodiapterna troitzkyi is a species of beetle of the family Scarabaeidae. It is found in China (Jilin), Japan, Korea, the Russian Far East, Siberia and Taiwan.

== Description ==
Adults reach a length of about 4–6 mm (0.16–0.24 in). They have a short, subsquare, strongly convex, shiny, glabrous, black body, with the margin of the clypeus and antennal club brownish.
