= Sinodiapterna =

Scientific classification
- Kingdom: Animalia
- Phylum: Arthropoda
- Clade: Pancrustacea
- Class: Insecta
- Order: Coleoptera
- Suborder: Polyphaga
- Infraorder: Scarabaeiformia
- Family: Scarabaeidae
- Subfamily: Aphodiinae
- Tribe: Aphodiini
- Genus: Sinodiapterna; Dellacasa, 1986

Synonyms
- Aphodius (Sinodiapterna) Dellacasa, 1986

Genus of beetles

Sinodiapterna is a genus of beetles of the family Scarabaeidae.

== Species ==
- Sinodiapterna gorodinskiyi (Gusakov, 2006)
- Sinodiapterna hammondi (Dellacasa, 1986)
- Sinodiapterna songrini (Stebnicka & Galante, 1992)
- Sinodiapterna troitzkyi (Jacobson, 1897)
- Sinodiapterna walamiensis Masumoto, Wang & Kiuchi, 2017
- Sinodiapterna yushana Li & Wang, 2017
- Sinodiapterna zeni (Ochi, 1991)
