= Sinodiapterna songrini =

Scientific classification
- Kingdom: Animalia
- Phylum: Arthropoda
- Clade: Pancrustacea
- Class: Insecta
- Order: Coleoptera
- Suborder: Polyphaga
- Infraorder: Scarabaeiformia
- Family: Scarabaeidae
- Genus: Sinodiapterna
- Species: S. songrini

Binomial name
- Sinodiapterna songrini (Stebnicka & Galante, 1992)

Synonyms
- Aphodius songrini Stebnicka & Galante, 1992

Species of beetle

Sinodiapterna songrini is a species of beetle of the family Scarabaeidae. It is found in North Korea and the Russian Far East.

== Description ==
Adults reach a length of about 1.5–2 mm (0.059–0.079 in). They have a short, oval, strongly shiny, black body.
