= Craterocyphus magnificus =

Scientific classification
- Kingdom: Animalia
- Phylum: Arthropoda
- Clade: Pancrustacea
- Class: Insecta
- Order: Coleoptera
- Suborder: Polyphaga
- Infraorder: Scarabaeiformia
- Family: Scarabaeidae
- Genus: Craterocyphus
- Species: C. magnificus

Binomial name
- Craterocyphus magnificus (Schmidt, 1909)

Synonyms
- Aphodius magnificus Schmidt, 1909

Species of beetle

Craterocyphus magnificus is a species of beetle of the family Scarabaeidae. It is found in Ethiopia.

== Description ==
Adults reach a length of about 11–11.5 mm (0.43–0.45 in). They have an oval-elongate, convex, shiny, glabrous, dark brown-reddish body. The margin of the clypeus, fore angles of the pronotum and the elytra are paler.
