= Craterocyphus forticornis =

Scientific classification
- Kingdom: Animalia
- Phylum: Arthropoda
- Clade: Pancrustacea
- Class: Insecta
- Order: Coleoptera
- Suborder: Polyphaga
- Infraorder: Scarabaeiformia
- Family: Scarabaeidae
- Genus: Craterocyphus
- Species: C. forticornis

Binomial name
- Craterocyphus forticornis (Schmidt, 1910)

Synonyms
- Aphodius forticornis Schmidt, 1910

Species of beetle

Craterocyphus forticornis is a species of beetle of the family Scarabaeidae. It is found in Malaysia and Thailand.

== Description ==
Adults reach a length of about 11 mm (0.43 in). They have an elongate, convex, shining, glabrous, light reddish-brown body, with the disc of the pronotum slightly darker.
