= Craterocyphus =

Scientific classification
- Kingdom: Animalia
- Phylum: Arthropoda
- Clade: Pancrustacea
- Class: Insecta
- Order: Coleoptera
- Suborder: Polyphaga
- Infraorder: Scarabaeiformia
- Family: Scarabaeidae
- Subfamily: Aphodiinae
- Tribe: Aphodiini
- Genus: Craterocyphus; Schmidt, 1914

Synonyms
- Aphodius (Craterocyphus) Schmidt, 1914; Aphodius (Hauserius) Balthasar, 1935

Genus of beetles

Craterocyphus is a genus of beetles of the family Scarabaeidae.

== Species ==
- Craterocyphus abscissus (Petrovitz, 1958)
- Craterocyphus bituberculatus (Endrödi, 1960)
- Craterocyphus forticornis (Schmidt, 1910)
- Craterocyphus ikuthanus (Balthasar, 1935)
- Craterocyphus illustris (Schmidt, 1920)
- Craterocyphus magnificus (Schmidt, 1909)
- Craterocyphus rhinoceros (Reiche, 1850)
- Craterocyphus serratodentatus (Petrovitz, 1964)
- Craterocyphus simplicicornis (Endrödi, 1960)
