= Sinaphodius sinuatus =

Scientific classification
- Kingdom: Animalia
- Phylum: Arthropoda
- Clade: Pancrustacea
- Class: Insecta
- Order: Coleoptera
- Suborder: Polyphaga
- Infraorder: Scarabaeiformia
- Family: Scarabaeidae
- Genus: Sinaphodius
- Species: S. sinuatus

Binomial name
- Sinaphodius sinuatus (Harold, 1860)

Synonyms
- Aphodius sinuatus Harold, 1860

Species of beetle

Sinaphodius sinuatus is a species of beetle of the family Scarabaeidae. It is found in the Philippines, Indonesia (Java) and India.

== Description ==
Adults reach a length of about 5–6 mm (0.20–0.24 in). They have a slightly convex, dirty reddish-brown body, with the head, pronotum and the tips of the elytra lighter. They are faintly glossy and are covered with short, light-colored pubescence.
