= Sinaphodius yunnanus =

Scientific classification
- Kingdom: Animalia
- Phylum: Arthropoda
- Clade: Pancrustacea
- Class: Insecta
- Order: Coleoptera
- Suborder: Polyphaga
- Infraorder: Scarabaeiformia
- Family: Scarabaeidae
- Genus: Sinaphodius
- Species: S. yunnanus

Binomial name
- Sinaphodius yunnanus (Červenka, 1994)

Synonyms
- Aphodius (Sinaphodius) yunnanus Červenka, 1994

Species of beetle

Sinaphodius yunnanus is a species of beetle of the family Scarabaeidae. It is found in China (Yunnan).

== Description ==
Adults reach a length of about 5–5.5 mm (0.20–0.22 in). They have a stout, convex, moderately shiny, dirty yellowish body, with the head and pronotum reddish at the sides. The elytra are sericeous apically.
