= Sinaphodius =

Scientific classification
- Kingdom: Animalia
- Phylum: Arthropoda
- Clade: Pancrustacea
- Class: Insecta
- Order: Coleoptera
- Suborder: Polyphaga
- Infraorder: Scarabaeiformia
- Family: Scarabaeidae
- Subfamily: Aphodiinae
- Tribe: Aphodiini
- Genus: Sinaphodius; Červenka, 1994

Synonyms
- Aphodius (Sinaphodius) Červenka, 1994

Genus of beetles

Sinaphodius is a genus of beetles of the family Scarabaeidae.

== Species ==
- Sinaphodius chitwanensis Schoolmeesters & Vandenheuvel, 1999
- Sinaphodius natalicus Mencl, Rakovič & Král, 2013
- Sinaphodius oharai Ochi & Kon, 2008
- Sinaphodius philippinensis Červenka, 1994
- Sinaphodius sinuatus (Harold, 1860)
- Sinaphodius sulawesiensis Ochi & Kon, 2004
- Sinaphodius yunnanus (Červenka, 1994)
