= Platyderides arrowi =

Scientific classification
- Kingdom: Animalia
- Phylum: Arthropoda
- Clade: Pancrustacea
- Class: Insecta
- Order: Coleoptera
- Suborder: Polyphaga
- Infraorder: Scarabaeiformia
- Family: Scarabaeidae
- Genus: Platyderides
- Species: P. arrowi

Binomial name
- Platyderides arrowi (Schmidt, 1910)

Synonyms
- Aphodius arrowi Schmidt, 1910

Species of beetle

Platyderides arrowi is a species of beetle of the family Scarabaeidae. It is found in China (Liaoning, Sichuan, Zhejiang).

== Description ==
Adults reach a length of about 8–10 mm (0.31–0.39 in). They have an elongate, subparallel, convex, shiny, nearly glabrous, piceous-brownish body. The clypeus and the sides of the pronotum are reddish and the antennal club is blackish.
