= Platyderides klapperichi =

Scientific classification
- Kingdom: Animalia
- Phylum: Arthropoda
- Clade: Pancrustacea
- Class: Insecta
- Order: Coleoptera
- Suborder: Polyphaga
- Infraorder: Scarabaeiformia
- Family: Scarabaeidae
- Genus: Platyderides
- Species: P. klapperichi

Binomial name
- Platyderides klapperichi (Balthasar, 1942)

Synonyms
- Aphodius (Platyderides) klapperichi Balthasar, 1942

Species of beetle

Platyderides klapperichi is a species of beetle of the family Scarabaeidae. It is found in China (Fujian).

== Description ==
Adults reach a length of about 8–10 mm (0.31–0.39 in). They have an elongate-oval, convex, glossy, black body. The anterior margin of the head, the lateral margins of the pronotum and the tips of the elytra are reddish, the latter with short, pale hairs toward the rear. The antennal club is yellowish-brown.
