= Platyderides =

Scientific classification
- Kingdom: Animalia
- Phylum: Arthropoda
- Clade: Pancrustacea
- Class: Insecta
- Order: Coleoptera
- Suborder: Polyphaga
- Infraorder: Scarabaeiformia
- Family: Scarabaeidae
- Subfamily: Aphodiinae
- Tribe: Aphodiini
- Genus: Platyderides; Schmidt, 1917

Synonyms
- Aphodius (Platyderides) Schmidt, 1917; Thaiaphodius Masumoto, 1991; Platyderus Schmidt, 1914

Genus of beetles

Platyderides is a genus of beetles of the family Scarabaeidae.

== Species ==
- Platyderides arrowi (Schmidt, 1910)
- Platyderides doiangkhangensis (Masumoto, 1991)
- Platyderides jengi (Masumoto, Kiuchi & Wang, 2014)
- Platyderides klapperichi (Balthasar, 1942)
- Platyderides vietnamicus (Červenka, 1995)
