= Mozartius =

Scientific classification
- Kingdom: Animalia
- Phylum: Arthropoda
- Clade: Pancrustacea
- Class: Insecta
- Order: Coleoptera
- Suborder: Polyphaga
- Infraorder: Scarabaeiformia
- Family: Scarabaeidae
- Subfamily: Aphodiinae
- Tribe: Aphodiini
- Genus: Mozartius; Nomura & Nakane, 1951

Genus of beetles

Mozartius is a genus of beetles of the family Scarabaeidae.

== Species ==
- Mozartius jugosus (Lewis, 1895)
- Mozartius kyushuensis Ochi, Kawahara & Kawai, 2002
- Mozartius testaceus Nomura & Nakane, 1951
- Mozartius uenoi Masumoto, 1984
