= Mozartius testaceus =

Scientific classification
- Kingdom: Animalia
- Phylum: Arthropoda
- Clade: Pancrustacea
- Class: Insecta
- Order: Coleoptera
- Suborder: Polyphaga
- Infraorder: Scarabaeiformia
- Family: Scarabaeidae
- Genus: Mozartius
- Species: M. testaceus

Binomial name
- Mozartius testaceus Nomura & Nakane, 1951

Species of beetle

Mozartius testaceus is a species of beetle of the family Scarabaeidae. It is found in Japan.

== Description ==
Adults reach a length of about 4.5 mm (0.18 in). They have an oblong-oval, convex, moderately shiny, nearly glabrous body, with a few hairs towards the apex of the elytra. They are brown-reddish, with the head, lateral margins of the pronotum and elytra paler and with a yellowish antennal club.

== Subspecies ==
- Mozartius testaceus testaceus (Japan)
- Mozartius testaceus shikokuensis Masumoto, 1984 (Japan)
