= Mozartius jugosus =

Scientific classification
- Kingdom: Animalia
- Phylum: Arthropoda
- Clade: Pancrustacea
- Class: Insecta
- Order: Coleoptera
- Suborder: Polyphaga
- Infraorder: Scarabaeiformia
- Family: Scarabaeidae
- Genus: Mozartius
- Species: M. jugosus

Binomial name
- Mozartius jugosus (Lewis, 1895)

Synonyms
- Oxyomus jugosus Lewis, 1895

Species of beetle

Mozartius jugosus is a species of beetle of the family Scarabaeidae. It is found in Japan.

== Description ==
Adults reach a length of about 4.3 mm (0.17 in). They have a dark brown, slightly glossy body.

== Subspecies ==
- Mozartius jugosus jugosus (Japan)
- Mozartius jugosus horii Ochi, Kawahara & Inagaki, 2006 (Japan: Fukushima)
- Mozartius jugosus shingoi Ochi, Kawahara & Inagaki, 2006 (Japan: Tsushima-shi)
