= Allobodilus notabilis =

Scientific classification
- Kingdom: Animalia
- Phylum: Arthropoda
- Clade: Pancrustacea
- Class: Insecta
- Order: Coleoptera
- Suborder: Polyphaga
- Infraorder: Scarabaeiformia
- Family: Scarabaeidae
- Genus: Allobodilus
- Species: A. notabilis

Binomial name
- Allobodilus notabilis (Petrovitz, 1963)

Synonyms
- Aphodius (Allobodilus) notabilis Petrovitz, 1963; Aphodius (Dibolus) gobabensis Endrödi, 1976

Species of beetle

Allobodilus notabilis is a species of beetle of the family Scarabaeidae. It is found in Botswana and Namibia.

== Description ==
Adults reach a length of about 5.5–6 mm (0.22–0.24 in). They have a subcylindrical, strongly convex, shiny, nearly glabrous, pale brown-reddish body, with the head and pronotum slightly darker.
