= Allobodilus =

Scientific classification
- Kingdom: Animalia
- Phylum: Arthropoda
- Clade: Pancrustacea
- Class: Insecta
- Order: Coleoptera
- Suborder: Polyphaga
- Infraorder: Scarabaeiformia
- Family: Scarabaeidae
- Subfamily: Aphodiinae
- Tribe: Aphodiini
- Genus: Allobodilus; Petrovitz, 1963

Synonyms
- Aphodius (Allobodilus) Petrovitz, 1963; Aphodius (Dibolus) Endrödi, 1976

Genus of beetles

Allobodilus is a genus of beetles of the family Scarabaeidae.

== Species ==
- Allobodilus fascinatus (Endrödi, 1980)
- Allobodilus notabilis (Petrovitz, 1963)
- Allobodilus obibensis (Endrödi, 1991)
- Allobodilus unicus (Bordat, 1990)
