= Allobodilus obibensis =

Scientific classification
- Kingdom: Animalia
- Phylum: Arthropoda
- Clade: Pancrustacea
- Class: Insecta
- Order: Coleoptera
- Suborder: Polyphaga
- Infraorder: Scarabaeiformia
- Family: Scarabaeidae
- Genus: Allobodilus
- Species: A. obibensis

Binomial name
- Allobodilus obibensis (Endrödi, 1991)

Synonyms
- Aphodius (Allobodilus) obibensis Endrödi, 1991

Species of beetle

Allobodilus obibensis is a species of beetle of the family Scarabaeidae. It is found in Namibia.

== Description ==
Adults reach a length of about 5–6 mm (0.20–0.24 in). They have a rather elongate, moderately shiny body, with the head and pronotum dark with reddish-brown margins. The elytra and legs are reddish-brown. The surface is mostly glabrous, but the margins of the pronotum and elytra bear long hairs.
