= Doaphius gracilis =

Scientific classification
- Kingdom: Animalia
- Phylum: Arthropoda
- Clade: Pancrustacea
- Class: Insecta
- Order: Coleoptera
- Suborder: Polyphaga
- Infraorder: Scarabaeiformia
- Family: Scarabaeidae
- Genus: Doaphius
- Species: D. gracilis

Binomial name
- Doaphius gracilis (Boheman, 1857)

Synonyms
- Aphodius gracilis Boheman, 1857; Aphodius (Erytus) gracilis lefiniensis Endrödi, 1967

Species of beetle

Doaphius gracilis is a species of beetle of the family Scarabaeidae. It is found in the Republic of the Congo, Botswana, Namibia and South Africa.

== Description ==
Adults reach a length of about 5 mm (0.20 in). They have an elongate, slightly convex, glossy, glabrous, light brown body.

== Subspecies ==
- Doaphius gracilis gracilis (Botswana, Namibia, South Africa:Transvaal, Free State)
- Doaphius gracilis lefiniensis (Endrödi, 1967) (Republic of the Congo)
