= Doaphius =

Scientific classification
- Kingdom: Animalia
- Phylum: Arthropoda
- Clade: Pancrustacea
- Class: Insecta
- Order: Coleoptera
- Suborder: Polyphaga
- Infraorder: Scarabaeiformia
- Family: Scarabaeidae
- Subfamily: Aphodiinae
- Tribe: Aphodiini
- Genus: Doaphius; Balthasar, 1941

Genus of beetles

Doaphius is a genus of beetles of the family Scarabaeidae.

== Species ==
- Doaphius batekensis Walter & Endrödi, 1981
- Doaphius clarissimus (Petrovitz, 1973)
- Doaphius gracilis (Boheman, 1857)
- Doaphius penicilarius (Petrovitz, 1963)
- Doaphius rufopolitus Balthasar, 1941
