= Doaphius rufopolitus =

Scientific classification
- Kingdom: Animalia
- Phylum: Arthropoda
- Clade: Pancrustacea
- Class: Insecta
- Order: Coleoptera
- Suborder: Polyphaga
- Infraorder: Scarabaeiformia
- Family: Scarabaeidae
- Genus: Doaphius
- Species: D. rufopolitus

Binomial name
- Doaphius rufopolitus Balthasar, 1941

Synonyms
- Erytus gracilioides Paulian, 1942

Species of beetle

Doaphius rufopolitus is a species of beetle of the family Scarabaeidae. It is found in Ethiopia, Kenya and Somalia.

== Description ==
Adults reach a length of about 5–6 mm (0.20–0.24 in). They have an elongate, subcylindrical, moderately convex, shiny, glabrous, brown-reddish body, with the disc of the pronotum darker.
