= Boucomontiellus =

Scientific classification
- Kingdom: Animalia
- Phylum: Arthropoda
- Clade: Pancrustacea
- Class: Insecta
- Order: Coleoptera
- Suborder: Polyphaga
- Infraorder: Scarabaeiformia
- Family: Scarabaeidae
- Subfamily: Aphodiinae
- Tribe: Aphodiini
- Genus: Boucomontiellus; Balthasar, 1932

Synonyms
- Aphodius (Boucomontiellus) Balthasar, 1932

Genus of beetles

Boucomontiellus is a genus of beetles of the family Scarabaeidae.

== Species ==
- Boucomontiellus pelliculosus (Balthasar, 1932)
- Boucomontiellus umbrinus (Koshantschikov, 1913)
