= Boucomontiellus pelliculosus =

Scientific classification
- Kingdom: Animalia
- Phylum: Arthropoda
- Clade: Pancrustacea
- Class: Insecta
- Order: Coleoptera
- Suborder: Polyphaga
- Infraorder: Scarabaeiformia
- Family: Scarabaeidae
- Genus: Boucomontiellus
- Species: B. pelliculosus

Binomial name
- Boucomontiellus pelliculosus (Balthasar, 1932)

Synonyms
- Aphodius (Boucomontiellus) pelliculosus Balthasar, 1932

Species of beetle

Boucomontiellus pelliculosus is a species of beetle of the family Scarabaeidae. It is found in China (Sichuan).

== Description ==
Adults reach a length of about 6.5–7.5 mm (0.26–0.30 in). They have an elongate-oval, moderately convex, densely pubescent body. The head and pronotum are shiny, while the elytra are dull. They have a blackish body, but the elytra are piceous and the legs are piceous with brown-reddish tarsi. The antennal club is blackish.
