= Boucomontiellus umbrinus =

Scientific classification
- Kingdom: Animalia
- Phylum: Arthropoda
- Clade: Pancrustacea
- Class: Insecta
- Order: Coleoptera
- Suborder: Polyphaga
- Infraorder: Scarabaeiformia
- Family: Scarabaeidae
- Genus: Boucomontiellus
- Species: B. umbrinus

Binomial name
- Boucomontiellus umbrinus (Koshantschikov, 1913)

Synonyms
- Aphodius (Amidorus) umbrinus Koshantschikov, 1913

Species of beetle

Boucomontiellus umbrinus is a species of beetle of the family Scarabaeidae. It is found in China (Jilin).

== Description ==
Adults reach a length of about 5 mm (0.20 in). They have a brownish-grey, completely dull body. The pronotum has only a few hairs, while the elytra are more densely covered with hairs.
