= Macroretrus confusus =

Scientific classification
- Kingdom: Animalia
- Phylum: Arthropoda
- Clade: Pancrustacea
- Class: Insecta
- Order: Coleoptera
- Suborder: Polyphaga
- Infraorder: Scarabaeiformia
- Family: Scarabaeidae
- Genus: Macroretrus
- Species: M. confusus

Binomial name
- Macroretrus confusus (Harold, 1862)

Synonyms
- Aphodius confusus Harold, 1862; Aphodius confusus Dejean, 1833

Species of beetle

Macroretrus confusus is a species of beetle of the family Scarabaeidae. It is found in Ethiopia, Kenya, Niger, Senegal, Somalia and Egypt.

== Description ==
Adults reach a length of about 3.8–4.2 mm (0.15–0.17 in). The anterior body is black, with the frontal margin of the head and the lateral margins of the pronotum yellow. The elytra are yellowish-brown, with black linear markings and darkened striae. The legs are light.
