= Macroretrus =

Scientific classification
- Kingdom: Animalia
- Phylum: Arthropoda
- Clade: Pancrustacea
- Class: Insecta
- Order: Coleoptera
- Suborder: Polyphaga
- Infraorder: Scarabaeiformia
- Family: Scarabaeidae
- Subfamily: Aphodiinae
- Tribe: Aphodiini
- Genus: Macroretrus; Péringuey, 1908

Genus of beetles

Macroretrus is a genus of beetles of the family Scarabaeidae.

== Species ==
- Macroretrus confusus (Harold, 1862)
- Macroretrus singularis Péringuey, 1908
- Macroretrus thilliezi Bordat, Dellacasa & Dellacasa, 2000
- Macroretrus zavattarii Müller, 1939
