= Macroretrus singularis =

Scientific classification
- Kingdom: Animalia
- Phylum: Arthropoda
- Clade: Pancrustacea
- Class: Insecta
- Order: Coleoptera
- Suborder: Polyphaga
- Infraorder: Scarabaeiformia
- Family: Scarabaeidae
- Genus: Macroretrus
- Species: M. singularis

Binomial name
- Macroretrus singularis Péringuey, 1908

Species of beetle

Macroretrus singularis is a species of beetle of the family Scarabaeidae. It is found in Malawi, South Africa, Zimbabwe and possibly Angola.

== Description ==
Adults reach a length of about 3.5–5 mm (0.14–0.20 in). They have a stout, strongly convex, glabrous, shiny body. The head, pronotum and scutellum are brown-blackish, and the margin of the clypeus and fore angles of the pronotum are brown-yellowish. The elytra are yellow-brown with a discal spot.
