= Dialytellus dialytoides =

Scientific classification
- Kingdom: Animalia
- Phylum: Arthropoda
- Clade: Pancrustacea
- Class: Insecta
- Order: Coleoptera
- Suborder: Polyphaga
- Infraorder: Scarabaeiformia
- Family: Scarabaeidae
- Genus: Dialytellus
- Species: D. dialytoides

Binomial name
- Dialytellus dialytoides (Fall, 1907)

Synonyms
- Aphodius dialytoides Fall, 1907

Species of beetle

Dialytellus dialytoides is a species of aphodiine dung beetle in the family Scarabaeidae. It is found in the United States (Maryland, Massachusetts, New Hampshire, North Carolina, South Carolina, Wisconsin) and Canada (New Brunswick, Ontario, Quebec).
