= Dialytellus tragicus =

Scientific classification
- Kingdom: Animalia
- Phylum: Arthropoda
- Clade: Pancrustacea
- Class: Insecta
- Order: Coleoptera
- Suborder: Polyphaga
- Infraorder: Scarabaeiformia
- Family: Scarabaeidae
- Genus: Dialytellus
- Species: D. tragicus

Binomial name
- Dialytellus tragicus (Schmidt, 1916)

Synonyms
- Aphodius lecontei Balthasar, 1941; Aphodius tragicus Schmidt, 1917; Aphodius (Stenobronchus) lecontei Balthasar, 1941; Aphodius humeralis LeConte, 1878

Species of beetle

Dialytellus tragicus is a species of aphodiine dung beetle in the family Scarabaeidae. It is found in Canada (Ontario, Quebec) and the United States (Maryland, Michigan, North Carolina).

== Description ==
Adults reach a length of about 3.5–4 mm (0.14–0.16 in). They have an oblong, stout, convex, very shiny, glabrous, black body. The margin of the clypeus, antennae and legs are brown-reddish.
