= Dialytellus =

Scientific classification
- Kingdom: Animalia
- Phylum: Arthropoda
- Clade: Pancrustacea
- Class: Insecta
- Order: Coleoptera
- Suborder: Polyphaga
- Infraorder: Scarabaeiformia
- Family: Scarabaeidae
- Tribe: Aphodiini
- Genus: Dialytellus; Brown, 1929

Genus of beetles

Dialytellus is a genus of aphodiine dung beetles in the family Scarabaeidae. There are at least three described species in Dialytellus.

== Species ==
- Dialytellus dialytoides (Fall, 1907)
- Dialytellus tragicus (LeConte, 1878)

== Selected former species ==
- Dialytellus humeralis (LeConte, 1878)
