= Nolicus areroensis =

Scientific classification
- Kingdom: Animalia
- Phylum: Arthropoda
- Clade: Pancrustacea
- Class: Insecta
- Order: Coleoptera
- Suborder: Polyphaga
- Infraorder: Scarabaeiformia
- Family: Scarabaeidae
- Genus: Nolicus
- Species: N. areroensis

Binomial name
- Nolicus areroensis Bordat & Minkina, 2019

Species of beetle

Nolicus areroensis is a species of beetle of the family Scarabaeidae. It is found in Ethiopia.

== Description ==
Adults reach a length of about 5.5–5.9 mm (0.22–0.23 in). They have an elongate, weakly shiny, weakly convex, glabrous, brownish body, with the sides and the elytra dark orange-brownish.

== Etymology ==
The species is named with regard to its geographical origin, Arero (Ethiopia).
