= Nolicus =

- Nolicus veteranus

Scientific classification
- Kingdom: Animalia
- Phylum: Arthropoda
- Clade: Pancrustacea
- Class: Insecta
- Order: Coleoptera
- Suborder: Polyphaga
- Infraorder: Scarabaeiformia
- Family: Scarabaeidae
- Subfamily: Aphodiinae
- Tribe: Aphodiini
- Genus: Nolicus; Petrovitz, 1962

Synonyms
- Aphodius (Nolicus) Petrovitz, 1962

Genus of beetles

Nolicus is a genus of beetles of the family Scarabaeidae.

== Species ==
- Nolicus areroensis Bordat & Minkina, 2019
- Nolicus veteranus (Petrovitz, 1962)
