= Nolicus veteranus =

Scientific classification
- Kingdom: Animalia
- Phylum: Arthropoda
- Clade: Pancrustacea
- Class: Insecta
- Order: Coleoptera
- Suborder: Polyphaga
- Infraorder: Scarabaeiformia
- Family: Scarabaeidae
- Genus: Nolicus
- Species: N. veteranus

Binomial name
- Nolicus veteranus (Petrovitz, 1962)

Synonyms
- Aphodius (Nolicus) veteranus Petrovitz, 1962; Aphodius (Cinacanthus) rakovici Endrödi, 1980

Species of beetle

Nolicus veteranus is a species of beetle of the family Scarabaeidae. It is found in southern Kalahari and Namibia.

== Description ==
Adults reach a length of about 6.5–7.5 mm (0.26–0.30 in). They have an oval-elongate, moderately convex, shiny, glabrous, brown-yellowish body. The front, disc of the pronotum, sides of the scutellum and elytral suture are dark brown.
