= Calocolobopterus senegalensis =

Scientific classification
- Kingdom: Animalia
- Phylum: Arthropoda
- Clade: Pancrustacea
- Class: Insecta
- Order: Coleoptera
- Suborder: Polyphaga
- Infraorder: Scarabaeiformia
- Family: Scarabaeidae
- Genus: Calocolobopterus
- Species: C. senegalensis

Binomial name
- Calocolobopterus senegalensis (Klug, 1835)

Synonyms
- Aphodius senegalensis Klug, 1835; Aphodius (Calocolobopterus) senegalensis ebenicolor Dellacasa, 1986; Aphodius senegalensis Laporte, 1840; Aphodius senegalensis Dejean, 1833

Species of beetle

Calocolobopterus senegalensis is a species of beetle of the family Scarabaeidae. It is found in Cameroon, the Central African Republic, Chad, Ethiopia, Ghana, Ivory Coast, Niger, the Democratic Republic of the Congo, Guinea, South Africa (Cape), Rwanda, Senegal, Tanzania and Uganda.

== Description ==
Adults reach a length of about 8–12 mm (0.31–0.47 in). They have an oblong-oval, convex, shiny, glabrous, testaceous body, with the sides of the pronotum and elytra yellowish. Sometimes, they are piceous with only the frontal angles of the pronotum and the apex of the elytra testaceous.
