= Calocolobopterus =

Scientific classification
- Kingdom: Animalia
- Phylum: Arthropoda
- Clade: Pancrustacea
- Class: Insecta
- Order: Coleoptera
- Suborder: Polyphaga
- Infraorder: Scarabaeiformia
- Family: Scarabaeidae
- Subfamily: Aphodiinae
- Tribe: Aphodiini
- Genus: Calocolobopterus; Dellacasa, 1984

Synonyms
- Aphodius (Calocolobopterus) Dellacasa, 1984

Genus of beetles

Calocolobopterus is a genus of beetles of the family Scarabaeidae.

== Species ==
- Calocolobopterus caprai Dellacasa, 1984
- Calocolobopterus diabolus (Endrödi, 1957)
- Calocolobopterus egregius (Petrovitz, 1958)
- Calocolobopterus magnicornis (Bordat, 1992)
- Calocolobopterus magnus (Endrödi, 1957)
- Calocolobopterus principalis (Harold, 1861)
- Calocolobopterus senegalensis (Klug, 1835)
- Calocolobopterus szekessyi (Endrödi, 1960)
