= Serraphodius lederi =

Scientific classification
- Kingdom: Animalia
- Phylum: Arthropoda
- Clade: Pancrustacea
- Class: Insecta
- Order: Coleoptera
- Suborder: Polyphaga
- Infraorder: Scarabaeiformia
- Family: Scarabaeidae
- Genus: Serraphodius
- Species: S. lederi

Binomial name
- Serraphodius lederi (Harold, 1876)

Synonyms
- Aphodius lederi Harold, 1876

Species of beetle

Serraphodius lederi is a species of beetle of the family Scarabaeidae. It is found in Georgia, Russia and Turkey.

== Description ==
Adults reach a length of about 4 mm (0.16 in). They have a strongly convex, rather short, oval, glabrous, black body, with the margins of the head and the pronotum light reddish. The elytra are yellowish-brown, with two black bands of spots. The legs are rust-red.
