= Serraphodius circassicus =

Scientific classification
- Kingdom: Animalia
- Phylum: Arthropoda
- Clade: Pancrustacea
- Class: Insecta
- Order: Coleoptera
- Suborder: Polyphaga
- Infraorder: Scarabaeiformia
- Family: Scarabaeidae
- Genus: Serraphodius
- Species: S. circassicus

Binomial name
- Serraphodius circassicus (Reitter, 1892)

Synonyms
- Aphodius (Amidorus) circassicus Reitter, 1892

Species of beetle

Serraphodius circassicus is a species of beetle of the family Scarabaeidae. It is found in Georgia and Russia.

== Description ==
Adults reach a length of about 6 mm (0.24 in). They have a moderately convex, rather short, glabrous, shiny body. The head, pronotum and scutellum are black, while the elytra are light chestnut-brown with a darkened suture.
