= Serraphodius =

Scientific classification
- Kingdom: Animalia
- Phylum: Arthropoda
- Clade: Pancrustacea
- Class: Insecta
- Order: Coleoptera
- Suborder: Polyphaga
- Infraorder: Scarabaeiformia
- Family: Scarabaeidae
- Subfamily: Aphodiinae
- Tribe: Aphodiini
- Genus: Serraphodius; Kabakov, 1996

Synonyms
- Aphodius (Serraphodius) Kabakov, 1996

Genus of beetles

Serraphodius is a genus of beetles of the family Scarabaeidae.

== Species ==
- Serraphodius circassicus (Reitter, 1892)
- Serraphodius lederi (Harold, 1876)
