= Emadiellus rufopustulatus =

Scientific classification
- Kingdom: Animalia
- Phylum: Arthropoda
- Clade: Pancrustacea
- Class: Insecta
- Order: Coleoptera
- Suborder: Polyphaga
- Infraorder: Scarabaeiformia
- Family: Scarabaeidae
- Genus: Emadiellus
- Species: E. rufopustulatus

Binomial name
- Emadiellus rufopustulatus (Wiedemann, 1823)

Synonyms
- Aphodius rufopustulatus Wiedemann, 1823; Aphodius (Biraloides) pistor Balthasar, 1945; Aphodius (Biraloides) pistor inconsultus Balthasar, 1945

Species of beetle

Emadiellus rufopustulatus is a species of beetle of the family Scarabaeidae. It is found in Cambodia, Laos, Myanmar, Thailand, Vietnam, Pakistan and India (Goa, Haryana, Punjab, West Bengal, Uttarakand).

== Description ==
Adults reach a length of about 5–6 mm (0.20–0.24 in). They have an oval, moderately convex, feebly shiny, glabrous, brown-blackish body. The clypeus, sides of the pronotum and a preapical spot on the elytra are reddish and sometimes, the elytra are blackish.

== Subspecies ==
- Emadiellus rufopustulatus rufopustulatus (Cambodia, Laos, Myanmar, Thailand, Vietnam, Pakistan, India: Goa, Haryana, Punjab, West Bengal, Uttarakand)
- Emadiellus rufopustulatus pistor (Balthasar, 1945) (Cambodia, Laos, Vietnam)
