= Emadiellus =

Scientific classification
- Kingdom: Animalia
- Phylum: Arthropoda
- Clade: Pancrustacea
- Class: Insecta
- Order: Coleoptera
- Suborder: Polyphaga
- Infraorder: Scarabaeiformia
- Family: Scarabaeidae
- Subfamily: Aphodiinae
- Tribe: Aphodiini
- Genus: Emadiellus; Schmidt, 1914

Synonyms
- Aphodius (Emadiellus) Schmidt, 1914; Aphodius (Biraloides) Balthasar, 1945

Genus of beetles

Emadiellus is a genus of beetles of the family Scarabaeidae.

== Species ==
- Emadiellus equestris (Endrödi, 1964)
- Emadiellus rufopustulatus (Wiedemann, 1823)
