= Neoheptaulacus puberulus =

Scientific classification
- Kingdom: Animalia
- Phylum: Arthropoda
- Clade: Pancrustacea
- Class: Insecta
- Order: Coleoptera
- Suborder: Polyphaga
- Infraorder: Scarabaeiformia
- Family: Scarabaeidae
- Genus: Neoheptaulacus
- Species: N. puberulus

Binomial name
- Neoheptaulacus puberulus (Boheman, 1857)

Synonyms
- Aphodius puberulus Boheman, 1857; Aphodius (Trichaphodius) boucomonti Balthasar, 1941; Aphodius (Trichaphodius) corniculans Boucomont, 1936; Aphodius (Trichaphodius) corniculatus Boucomont, 1933; Aphodius (Trichaphodius) corniculatus scotti Paulian, 1939

Species of beetle

Neoheptaulacus puberulus is a species of beetle of the family Scarabaeidae. It is found in Ethiopia, Kenya, the Democratic Republic of the Congo and South Africa (Eastern Cape).

== Description ==
Adults reach a length of about 4.5–5.5 mm (0.18–0.22 in). They have an oval-elongate, convex, brown-reddish or piceous body. The head and pronotum are shiny, while the elytra are sericeous and pubescent toward the apex.

== Subspecies ==
- Neoheptaulacus puberulus puberulus (Kenya, Democratic Republic of the Congo, South Africa: Eastern Cape)
- Neoheptaulacus puberulus scotti (Paulian, 1939) (Ethiopia)
