= Neoheptaulacus =

Scientific classification
- Kingdom: Animalia
- Phylum: Arthropoda
- Clade: Pancrustacea
- Class: Insecta
- Order: Coleoptera
- Suborder: Polyphaga
- Infraorder: Scarabaeiformia
- Family: Scarabaeidae
- Subfamily: Aphodiinae
- Tribe: Aphodiini
- Genus: Neoheptaulacus; Paulian & Villiers, 1941

Synonyms
- Trichaphodius (Schmidtaphodius) Paulian, 1942

Genus of beetles

Neoheptaulacus is a genus of beetles of the family Scarabaeidae.

== Species ==
- Neoheptaulacus hepaticolor (Quedenfeldt, 1884)
- Neoheptaulacus puberulus (Boheman, 1857)
