= Neoemadiellus uxoris =

Scientific classification
- Kingdom: Animalia
- Phylum: Arthropoda
- Clade: Pancrustacea
- Class: Insecta
- Order: Coleoptera
- Suborder: Polyphaga
- Infraorder: Scarabaeiformia
- Family: Scarabaeidae
- Genus: Neoemadiellus
- Species: N. uxoris

Binomial name
- Neoemadiellus uxoris (Clément, 1986)

Synonyms
- Aphodius (Neoemadiellus) uxoris Clément, 1986

Species of beetle

Neoemadiellus uxoris is a species of beetle of the family Scarabaeidae. It is found in Madagascar.

== Description ==
Adults reach a length of about 3.5–4 mm (0.14–0.16 in). They have a moderately convex, shiny, glabrous, piceous body. The lateral margins of the pronotum and the elytra are brown-yellowish, the latter with the sutural margin and a spot darker, and with subhumeral and preapical small yellowish maculae.
