= Neoemadiellus =

Scientific classification
- Kingdom: Animalia
- Phylum: Arthropoda
- Clade: Pancrustacea
- Class: Insecta
- Order: Coleoptera
- Suborder: Polyphaga
- Infraorder: Scarabaeiformia
- Family: Scarabaeidae
- Subfamily: Aphodiinae
- Tribe: Aphodiini
- Genus: Neoemadiellus; Clément, 1986

Synonyms
- Aphodius (Neoemadiellus) Clément, 1986; Aphodius (Madagaphodius) Bordat, 1990

Genus of beetles

Neoemadiellus is a genus of beetles of the family Scarabaeidae.

== Species ==
- Neoemadiellus andringitraensis (Maté, 2007)
- Neoemadiellus didactylioides (Bordat, 1990)
- Neoemadiellus humerosanguineum (Maté, 2007)
- Neoemadiellus perinetensis (Bordat, 1990)
- Neoemadiellus peyrierasi (Bordat, 1990)
- Neoemadiellus ranomafanaensis (Maté, 2007)
- Neoemadiellus ranomandryensis (Bordat, 1990)
- Neoemadiellus unctus (Bordat, 1990)
- Neoemadiellus uxoris (Clément, 1986)
- Neoemadiellus viljanenae (Maté, 2007)
