= Coptochirus =

Scientific classification
- Kingdom: Animalia
- Phylum: Arthropoda
- Clade: Pancrustacea
- Class: Insecta
- Order: Coleoptera
- Suborder: Polyphaga
- Infraorder: Scarabaeiformia
- Family: Scarabaeidae
- Subfamily: Aphodiinae
- Tribe: Aphodiini
- Genus: Coptochirus; Harold, 1859

Genus of beetles

Coptochirus is a genus of beetles of the family Scarabaeidae.

== Species ==
- Coptochirus alternatus Bordat, 1989
- Coptochirus brachypterus Harold, 1868
- Coptochirus cognatus Péringuey, 1901
- Coptochirus emarginatus (Germar, 1823)
- Coptochirus endroedyyoungai Bordat, 1989
- Coptochirus excisus Harold, 1868
- Coptochirus pallidipennis Harold, 1868
- Coptochirus perlucidus Bordat, 1989
- Coptochirus pteropus Harold, 1859
- Coptochirus reticulatus Bordat, 1989
- Coptochirus vulgatus Harold, 1868
