= Coptochirus pteropus =

Scientific classification
- Kingdom: Animalia
- Phylum: Arthropoda
- Clade: Pancrustacea
- Class: Insecta
- Order: Coleoptera
- Suborder: Polyphaga
- Infraorder: Scarabaeiformia
- Family: Scarabaeidae
- Genus: Coptochirus
- Species: C. pteropus

Binomial name
- Coptochirus pteropus Harold, 1859

Synonyms
- Aphodius erinaceus Chevrolat, 1869; Aphodius pteropus Hoffmannsegg, 1848; Aphodius tarsalis Sturm, 1843; Aphodius pteropus Illiger, 1833

Species of beetle

Coptochirus pteropus is a species of beetle of the family Scarabaeidae. It is found in South Africa (Cape).

== Description ==
Adults reach a length of about 4.5–5 mm (0.18–0.20 in). They have an elongate, moderately convex, feebly shiny body. The head and pronotum are glabrous, while the elytra are pubescent. The head and pronotum are brown-blackish, with the clypeus and the lateral margins of the pronotum brown-yellowish. The scutellum is blackish at the sides and the elytra are yellowish.
