= Afroemadiellus =

Scientific classification
- Kingdom: Animalia
- Phylum: Arthropoda
- Clade: Pancrustacea
- Class: Insecta
- Order: Coleoptera
- Suborder: Polyphaga
- Infraorder: Scarabaeiformia
- Family: Scarabaeidae
- Subfamily: Aphodiinae
- Tribe: Aphodiini
- Genus: Afroemadiellus; Bordat, 2019

Genus of beetles

Afroemadiellus is a genus of beetles of the family Scarabaeidae.

== Species ==
- Afroemadiellus comptus (Schmidt, 1910)
- Afroemadiellus cruentus (Klug, 1855)
- Afroemadiellus deminutus Bordat, 2019
- Afroemadiellus duvoti Bordat, 2019
- Afroemadiellus integer (Endrödi, 1960)
- Afroemadiellus luciphilus (Endrödi, 1973)
- Afroemadiellus niunzuensis (Paulian, 1942)
- Afroemadiellus optatoides (Landin, 1967)
- Afroemadiellus pseudointeger Bordat, 2019
- Afroemadiellus seydeli (Paulian, 1939)
- Afroemadiellus viduus (Petrovitz, 1966)
- Afroemadiellus villiersianus (Clément, 1969)
- Afroemadiellus vrydaghi Bordat, 2019
- Afroemadiellus zonatus (Endrödi, 1964)
