= Afroemadiellus comptus =

Scientific classification
- Kingdom: Animalia
- Phylum: Arthropoda
- Clade: Pancrustacea
- Class: Insecta
- Order: Coleoptera
- Suborder: Polyphaga
- Infraorder: Scarabaeiformia
- Family: Scarabaeidae
- Genus: Afroemadiellus
- Species: A. comptus

Binomial name
- Afroemadiellus comptus (Schmidt, 1910)

Synonyms
- Aphodius comptus Schmidt, 1910

Species of beetle

Afroemadiellus comptus is a species of beetle of the family Scarabaeidae. It is found in Uganda.

== Description ==
Adults reach a length of about 4 mm (0.16 in). They have an oblong, smooth, very glossy, flatly convex, greyish-brown body, with the back of the head and the disc of the pronotum darker.
