= Australaphodius frenchi =

Scientific classification
- Kingdom: Animalia
- Phylum: Arthropoda
- Clade: Pancrustacea
- Class: Insecta
- Order: Coleoptera
- Suborder: Polyphaga
- Infraorder: Scarabaeiformia
- Family: Scarabaeidae
- Subfamily: Aphodiinae
- Genus: Australaphodius
- Species: A. frenchi

Binomial name
- Australaphodius frenchi (Blackburn, 1892)

Synonyms
- Aphodius frenchi Blackburn, 1892; Aphodius brevitarsis Péringuey, 1901; Aphodius melbournicus Balthasar, 1942; Aphodius tarsalis Schmidt, 1907; Aphodius ambiguus Boheman, 1858

Species of beetle

Australaphodius frenchi, the little pasture cockchafer, is a species of aphodiine dung beetle in the family Scarabaeidae. It is found in Australia (South Australia, Victoria, Western Australia, Tasmania), New Zealand, South Africa, the United States (California), Chile and Mexico (Tamaulipas)

== Description ==
Adults reach a length of about 3.2–4.5 mm (0.13–0.18 in). They have a shiny, reddish black to black body, with the elytra usually lighter than the head and pronotum.

== Life history ==
Specimens have been collected in pastures and coastal forests.
