= Australaphodius =

Scientific classification
- Kingdom: Animalia
- Phylum: Arthropoda
- Clade: Pancrustacea
- Class: Insecta
- Order: Coleoptera
- Suborder: Polyphaga
- Infraorder: Scarabaeiformia
- Family: Scarabaeidae
- Subfamily: Aphodiinae
- Genus: Australaphodius; Balthasar, 1942

Synonyms
- Aphodius (Australaphodius) Balthasar, 1942

Genus of beetles

Australaphodius is a genus of aphodiine dung beetles in the family Scarabaeidae. There are at least four described species in Australaphodius.

== Species ==
These species belong to the genus Australaphodius:

- Australaphodius accola (Kolbe, 1908)
- Australaphodius frenchi (Blackburn, 1892)
- Australaphodius muellerae Bordat, 1990
