= Dilortomaeus senegalensis =

Scientific classification
- Kingdom: Animalia
- Phylum: Arthropoda
- Clade: Pancrustacea
- Class: Insecta
- Order: Coleoptera
- Suborder: Polyphaga
- Infraorder: Scarabaeiformia
- Family: Scarabaeidae
- Genus: Dilortomaeus
- Species: D. senegalensis

Binomial name
- Dilortomaeus senegalensis Bordat, 2013

Species of beetle

Dilortomaeus senegalensis is a species of beetle of the family Scarabaeidae. It is found in Angola, Cameroon, Chad, Ethiopia, Niger, Senegal and Sudan.

== Description ==
Adults reach a length of about 4–4.9 mm (0.16–0.19 in). The head and pronotum are brownish-yellow, with the vertex, epistome, and pronotal disc more or less extensively dark brown. The scutellum is dark brown and the elytra are brownish-yellow, with a large, somewhat darkened, nebulous spot. The elytral suture consists of two small maculae (one located medially on the fourth interstria, and the other preapical on the sixth interstria). The head and pronotum are glossy, while the elytra are finely reticulated. The legs are reddish-brown. They are entirely pubescent.

== Etymology ==
The species name refers to its geographical origin.
