= Dilortomaeus =

- Dilortomaeus senegalensis

Scientific classification
- Kingdom: Animalia
- Phylum: Arthropoda
- Clade: Pancrustacea
- Class: Insecta
- Order: Coleoptera
- Suborder: Polyphaga
- Infraorder: Scarabaeiformia
- Family: Scarabaeidae
- Subfamily: Aphodiinae
- Tribe: Aphodiini
- Genus: Dilortomaeus; Bordat, 2009

Genus of beetles

Dilortomaeus is a genus of beetles of the family Scarabaeidae.

== Species ==
- Dilortomaeus angolensis (Bordat, 1994)
- Dilortomaeus deformis Bordat, 2009
- Dilortomaeus excultus (Péringuey, 1908)
- Dilortomaeus senegalensis Bordat, 2013
- Dilortomaeus setulosus (Schmidt, 1908)
