= Aphodiopsis =

Scientific classification
- Kingdom: Animalia
- Phylum: Arthropoda
- Clade: Pancrustacea
- Class: Insecta
- Order: Coleoptera
- Suborder: Polyphaga
- Infraorder: Scarabaeiformia
- Family: Scarabaeidae
- Subfamily: Aphodiinae
- Tribe: Aphodiini
- Genus: Aphodiopsis; Paulian, 1942

Genus of beetles

Aphodiopsis is a genus of beetles of the family Scarabaeidae.

== Species ==
- Aphodiopsis camerunensis (Petrovitz, 1969)
- Aphodiopsis cubita (Petrovitz, 1966)
- Aphodiopsis evestigata Bordat, 2014
- Aphodiopsis kumasianus (Endrödi, 1973)
- Aphodiopsis latens Bordat, 2014
- Aphodiopsis latipes Paulian, 1942
- Aphodiopsis motoensis (Endrödi, 1964)
- Aphodiopsis olseni (Petrovitz, 1962)
- Aphodiopsis paulianellus (Endrödi, 1964)
- Aphodiopsis problematicus (Petrovitz, 1973)
- Aphodiopsis radians (Endrödi, 1964)
- Aphodiopsis raucus (Endrödi, 1964)
- Aphodiopsis subopaca (Petrovitz, 1964)
