= Aphodiopsis latipes =

Scientific classification
- Kingdom: Animalia
- Phylum: Arthropoda
- Clade: Pancrustacea
- Class: Insecta
- Order: Coleoptera
- Suborder: Polyphaga
- Infraorder: Scarabaeiformia
- Family: Scarabaeidae
- Genus: Aphodiopsis
- Species: A. latipes

Binomial name
- Aphodiopsis latipes Paulian, 1942

Species of beetle

Aphodiopsis latipes is a species of beetle of the family Scarabaeidae. It is found in Ivory Coast.

== Description ==
Adults reach a length of about 4.5 mm (0.18 in). They have an elongate-oval, convex, sericeous, glabrous, brown-reddish body, with the front and disc of the pronotum darker.
