= Trigonoscelus =

Scientific classification
- Kingdom: Animalia
- Phylum: Arthropoda
- Clade: Pancrustacea
- Class: Insecta
- Order: Coleoptera
- Suborder: Polyphaga
- Infraorder: Scarabaeiformia
- Family: Scarabaeidae
- Subfamily: Aphodiinae
- Tribe: Aphodiini
- Genus: Trigonoscelus; Petrovitz, 1963

Synonyms
- Aphodius (Trigonoscelus) Petrovitz, 1963

Genus of beetles

Trigonoscelus is a genus of beetles of the family Scarabaeidae.

== Species ==
- Trigonoscelus afghanus Petrovitz, 1963
- Trigonoscelus coelebs (Petrovitz, 1963)
- Trigonoscelus elbursensis Stebnicka & Galante, 1991
- Trigonoscelus hypi Král, 2017
- Trigonoscelus narayaniensis Ilcikova & Král, 2004
- Trigonoscelus rakovici Král & Mencl, 2025
