= Trigonoscelus coelebs =

Scientific classification
- Kingdom: Animalia
- Phylum: Arthropoda
- Clade: Pancrustacea
- Class: Insecta
- Order: Coleoptera
- Suborder: Polyphaga
- Infraorder: Scarabaeiformia
- Family: Scarabaeidae
- Genus: Trigonoscelus
- Species: T. coelebs

Binomial name
- Trigonoscelus coelebs (Petrovitz, 1963)

Synonyms
- Aphodius (Trigonoscelus) coelebs Petrovitz, 1963

Species of beetle

Trigonoscelus coelebs is a species of beetle of the family Scarabaeidae. It is found in Pakistan.

== Description ==
Adults reach a length of about 4.5 mm (0.18 in). They have an elongate, parallel-sided, subshiny, mostly glabrous body. The head is brownish with the margin of the clypeus paler. The pronotum is brownish, but brown-reddish distally and the anterior angles are brown-yellowish. The elytra are brown-yellowish with darker suture, the legs are brownish an the antennal club is yellowish.
