= Pseudodrepanocanthus =

Scientific classification
- Kingdom: Animalia
- Phylum: Arthropoda
- Clade: Pancrustacea
- Class: Insecta
- Order: Coleoptera
- Suborder: Polyphaga
- Infraorder: Scarabaeiformia
- Family: Scarabaeidae
- Subfamily: Aphodiinae
- Tribe: Aphodiini
- Genus: Pseudodrepanocanthus; Bordat, 1993

Synonyms
- Drepanocanthus (Pseudodrepanocanthus) Bordat, 1993

Genus of beetles

Pseudodrepanocanthus is a genus of beetles of the family Scarabaeidae.

== Species ==
- Pseudodrepanocanthus nasutus (Harold, 1869)
- Pseudodrepanocanthus obscurus (Bordat, 1993)
- Pseudodrepanocanthus spinitarsis (Péringuey, 1901)
