= Pseudodrepanocanthus nasutus =

Scientific classification
- Kingdom: Animalia
- Phylum: Arthropoda
- Clade: Pancrustacea
- Class: Insecta
- Order: Coleoptera
- Suborder: Polyphaga
- Infraorder: Scarabaeiformia
- Family: Scarabaeidae
- Genus: Pseudodrepanocanthus
- Species: P. nasutus

Binomial name
- Pseudodrepanocanthus nasutus (Harold, 1869)

Synonyms
- Harmogaster nasuta Harold, 1869; Drepanocanthus connexus Péringuey, 1901

Species of beetle

Pseudodrepanocanthus nasutus is a species of beetle of the family Scarabaeidae. It is found in South Africa (Cape, KwaZulu-Natal).

== Description ==
Adults reach a length of about 4–4.5 mm (0.16–0.18 in). They have an elongate, moderately convex, feebly shiny, glabrous body. The head and pronotum are piceous, while the clypeus and lateral margins of the pronotum are testaceous, and the scutellum and elytra are brown-yellowish, the latter with brown-blackish suture.
