= Pseudoheptaulacus =

Scientific classification
- Kingdom: Animalia
- Phylum: Arthropoda
- Clade: Pancrustacea
- Class: Insecta
- Order: Coleoptera
- Suborder: Polyphaga
- Infraorder: Scarabaeiformia
- Family: Scarabaeidae
- Subfamily: Aphodiinae
- Tribe: Aphodiini
- Genus: Pseudoheptaulacus; Dellacasa & Dellacasa, 2000

Genus of beetles

Pseudoheptaulacus is a genus of beetles of the family Scarabaeidae.

== Species ==
- Pseudoheptaulacus azumai Ochi, Kon & Kawahara, 2014
- Pseudoheptaulacus iniquus (Schmidt, 1909)
- Pseudoheptaulacus nepalensis Pittino, 2004
- Pseudoheptaulacus reikoae Ochi, Kon & Kawahara, 2014
