= Pseudoheptaulacus iniquus =

Scientific classification
- Kingdom: Animalia
- Phylum: Arthropoda
- Clade: Pancrustacea
- Class: Insecta
- Order: Coleoptera
- Suborder: Polyphaga
- Infraorder: Scarabaeiformia
- Family: Scarabaeidae
- Genus: Pseudoheptaulacus
- Species: P. iniquus

Binomial name
- Pseudoheptaulacus iniquus (Schmidt, 1909)

Synonyms
- Heptaulacus iniquus Schmidt, 1909

Species of beetle

Pseudoheptaulacus iniquus is a species of beetle of the family Scarabaeidae. It is found in China (Yunnan).

== Description ==
Adults reach a length of about 2.5–3.5 mm (0.098–0.138 in). They have a moderately convex, glossy body. The forebody is dark brown, with the front and sides of the head, and the sides of the pronotum yellow. The elytra are lighter brown and the legs are brown.
