= Pseudoagoliinus =

Scientific classification
- Kingdom: Animalia
- Phylum: Arthropoda
- Clade: Pancrustacea
- Class: Insecta
- Order: Coleoptera
- Suborder: Polyphaga
- Infraorder: Scarabaeiformia
- Family: Scarabaeidae
- Subfamily: Aphodiinae
- Tribe: Aphodiini
- Genus: Pseudoagoliinus; Bordat, 1994

Synonyms
- Aphodius (Pseudoagoliinus) Bordat, 1994

Genus of beetles

Pseudoagoliinus is a genus of beetles of the family Scarabaeidae.

== Species ==
- Pseudoagoliinus glabratus (Bordat, 2005)
- Pseudoagoliinus oreotragi (Endrödi, 1978)
- Pseudoagoliinus sinuatipes (Bordat, 1994)
- Pseudoagoliinus tonderae (Endrödi, 1980)
