= Pseudoagoliinus sinuatipes =

Scientific classification
- Kingdom: Animalia
- Phylum: Arthropoda
- Clade: Pancrustacea
- Class: Insecta
- Order: Coleoptera
- Suborder: Polyphaga
- Infraorder: Scarabaeiformia
- Family: Scarabaeidae
- Genus: Pseudoagoliinus
- Species: P. sinuatipes

Binomial name
- Pseudoagoliinus sinuatipes (Bordat, 1994)

Synonyms
- Aphodius (Pseudoagoliinus) sinuatipes Bordat, 1994

Species of beetle

Pseudoagoliinus sinuatipes is a species of beetle of the family Scarabaeidae. It is found in South Africa (Western Cape).

== Description ==
Adults reach a length of about 4–4.5 mm (0.16–0.18 in). They have a rather stout, convex, shiny, glabrous, brown-blackish body, with the front margin of the pronotum reddish.
