= Simogonius beccarii =

Scientific classification
- Kingdom: Animalia
- Phylum: Arthropoda
- Clade: Pancrustacea
- Class: Insecta
- Order: Coleoptera
- Suborder: Polyphaga
- Infraorder: Scarabaeiformia
- Family: Scarabaeidae
- Genus: Simogonius
- Species: S. beccarii

Binomial name
- Simogonius beccarii Harold, 1871

Synonyms
- Liparochirus simplex Péringuey, 1901

Species of beetle

Simogonius beccarii is a species of beetle of the family Scarabaeidae. It is found in Angola, Burundi, Cameroon, Chad, Ethiopia, Ghana, Ivory Coast, the Democratic Republic of the Congo, Guinea, the Republic of the Congo and Rwanda.

== Description ==
Adults reach a length of about 4–5 mm (0.16–0.20 in). They have an oval-subelongate, convex, shiny, pubescent, blackish body. The clypeus, anterior angles of the pronotum and sometimes the elytra are brown-reddish.
