= Simogonius =

Scientific classification
- Kingdom: Animalia
- Phylum: Arthropoda
- Clade: Pancrustacea
- Class: Insecta
- Order: Coleoptera
- Suborder: Polyphaga
- Infraorder: Scarabaeiformia
- Family: Scarabaeidae
- Subfamily: Aphodiinae
- Tribe: Aphodiini
- Genus: Simogonius; Harold, 1871

Synonyms
- Liparochirus Péringuey, 1901

Genus of beetles

Simogonius is a genus of beetles of the family Scarabaeidae.

== Species ==
- Simogonius beccarii Harold, 1871
- Simogonius janssensi Paulian, 1954
- Simogonius minusculus Schmidt, 1920
- Simogonius morettoi Bordat, 2017
- Simogonius setosus Petrovitz, 1969
