= Paranimbus =

Scientific classification
- Kingdom: Animalia
- Phylum: Arthropoda
- Clade: Pancrustacea
- Class: Insecta
- Order: Coleoptera
- Suborder: Polyphaga
- Infraorder: Scarabaeiformia
- Family: Scarabaeidae
- Subfamily: Aphodiinae
- Tribe: Aphodiini
- Genus: Paranimbus; Schmidt, 1914

Synonyms
- Aphodius (Paranimbus) Schmidt, 1914

Genus of beetles

Paranimbus is a genus of beetles of the family Scarabaeidae.

== Species ==
- Paranimbus longitarsis (Harold, 1860)
- Paranimbus penai (Petrovitz, 1970)
- Paranimbus peruanus (Erichson, 1834)
- Paranimbus zoiai (Dellacasa, 1990)
