= Paranimbus peruanus =

Scientific classification
- Kingdom: Animalia
- Phylum: Arthropoda
- Clade: Pancrustacea
- Class: Insecta
- Order: Coleoptera
- Suborder: Polyphaga
- Infraorder: Scarabaeiformia
- Family: Scarabaeidae
- Genus: Paranimbus
- Species: P. peruanus

Binomial name
- Paranimbus peruanus (Erichson, 1834)

Synonyms
- Aphodius peruanus Erichson, 1834

Species of beetle

Paranimbus peruanus is a species of beetle of the family Scarabaeidae. It is found in Bolivia, Chile and Peru.

== Description ==
Adults reach a length of about 7–8 mm (0.28–0.31 in). They have an elongate, flattened, pubescent, rather shiny body, although the elytra are almost dull. The head and pronotum are blackish, with reddish lateral margins. The elytra are yellow-brownish with a blackish discal spot. The antennal club is piceous and the legs are brownish. The ventral surface is testaceous.
