= Aphodiellus impunctatus =

Scientific classification
- Kingdom: Animalia
- Phylum: Arthropoda
- Clade: Pancrustacea
- Class: Insecta
- Order: Coleoptera
- Suborder: Polyphaga
- Infraorder: Scarabaeiformia
- Family: Scarabaeidae
- Genus: Aphodiellus
- Species: A. impunctatus

Binomial name
- Aphodiellus impunctatus (Waterhouse, 1875)

Synonyms
- Aphodius impunctatus Waterhouse, 1875; Aphodius laevigatus Harold, 1886

Species of beetle

Aphodiellus impunctatus is a species of beetle of the family Scarabaeidae. It is found in China (Beijing, Heilongjiang, Jilin, Ningxia, Shanxi), Japan, Korea and the Russia (Russian Far East, Siberia).

== Description ==
Adults reach a length of about 7–8 mm (0.28–0.31 in). They have an elongate, moderately convex, subparallel-sided, shiny, glabrous, dark chestnut-brown body, with the antennal club pale testaceous.
