= Aphodiellus =

Scientific classification
- Kingdom: Animalia
- Phylum: Arthropoda
- Clade: Pancrustacea
- Class: Insecta
- Order: Coleoptera
- Suborder: Polyphaga
- Infraorder: Scarabaeiformia
- Family: Scarabaeidae
- Subfamily: Aphodiinae
- Tribe: Aphodiini
- Genus: Aphodiellus; Schmidt, 1914

Synonyms
- Aphodius (Aphodiellus) Schmidt, 1914

Genus of beetles

Aphodiellus is a genus of beetles of the family Scarabaeidae.

== Species ==
- Aphodiellus genialis (Péringuey, 1901)
- Aphodiellus impunctatus (Waterhouse, 1875)
