= Metoporaphodius =

Scientific classification
- Kingdom: Animalia
- Phylum: Arthropoda
- Clade: Pancrustacea
- Class: Insecta
- Order: Coleoptera
- Suborder: Polyphaga
- Infraorder: Scarabaeiformia
- Family: Scarabaeidae
- Subfamily: Aphodiinae
- Tribe: Aphodiini
- Genus: Metoporaphodius; Frolov & Akhmetova, 2017

Genus of beetles

Metoporaphodius is a genus of beetles of the family Scarabaeidae.

== Species ==
- Metoporaphodius baghlanicus (Frolov, 1997)
- Metoporaphodius plustschewskii (Koshantschikov, 1894)
