= Metoporaphodius plustschewskii =

Scientific classification
- Kingdom: Animalia
- Phylum: Arthropoda
- Clade: Pancrustacea
- Class: Insecta
- Order: Coleoptera
- Suborder: Polyphaga
- Infraorder: Scarabaeiformia
- Family: Scarabaeidae
- Genus: Metoporaphodius
- Species: M. plustschewskii

Binomial name
- Metoporaphodius plustschewskii (Koshantschikov, 1894)

Synonyms
- Aphodius (Volinus) plustschewskii Koshantschikov, 1894

Species of beetle

Metoporaphodius plustschewskii is a species of beetle of the family Scarabaeidae. It is found in Kyrgyzstan and Russia.

== Description ==
Adults reach a length of about 6.5–7 mm (0.26–0.28 in). They have an elongate-oval, highly glossy, glabrous, black body, the pronotum with reddish sides. The elytra are yellowish-brown with a blackened sutural interval and dark markings.

== Life history ==
The species inhabits Caspian lowland and Middle Asian deserts, where it has been recorded feeding on horse dung.
