= Colobopteridius =

Scientific classification
- Kingdom: Animalia
- Phylum: Arthropoda
- Clade: Pancrustacea
- Class: Insecta
- Order: Coleoptera
- Suborder: Polyphaga
- Infraorder: Scarabaeiformia
- Family: Scarabaeidae
- Subfamily: Aphodiinae
- Tribe: Aphodiini
- Genus: Colobopteridius; Clément, 1958

Synonyms
- Colobopterus (Colobopteridius) Clément, 1958

Genus of beetles

Colobopteridius is a genus of beetles of the family Scarabaeidae.

== Species ==
- Colobopteridius drumonti Bordat, 2024
- Colobopteridius renaudi (Clément, 1958)
