= Colobopteridius renaudi =

Scientific classification
- Kingdom: Animalia
- Phylum: Arthropoda
- Clade: Pancrustacea
- Class: Insecta
- Order: Coleoptera
- Suborder: Polyphaga
- Infraorder: Scarabaeiformia
- Family: Scarabaeidae
- Genus: Colobopteridius
- Species: C. renaudi

Binomial name
- Colobopteridius renaudi (Clément, 1958)

Synonyms
- Colobopterus (Colobopteridius) renaudi Clément, 1958

Species of beetle

Colobopteridius renaudi is a species of beetle of the family Scarabaeidae. It is found in Cameroon and Ivory Coast.

== Description ==
Adults reach a length of about 8–10 mm (0.31–0.39 in). They have a subparallel-sided, longitudinally flattened, nearly glabrous, moderately shiny, brown-reddish body. Part of the head, the basal margin of the pronotum and the elytral suture are darker. The front angles of the pronotum and antennal club are pale testaceous and the legs are brownish.
