= Tristaphodius mortuorum =

Scientific classification
- Kingdom: Animalia
- Phylum: Arthropoda
- Clade: Pancrustacea
- Class: Insecta
- Order: Coleoptera
- Suborder: Polyphaga
- Infraorder: Scarabaeiformia
- Family: Scarabaeidae
- Genus: Tristaphodius
- Species: T. mortuorum

Binomial name
- Tristaphodius mortuorum (Balthasar, 1932)

Synonyms
- Aphodius (Tristaphodius) mortuorum Balthasar, 1932

Species of beetle

Tristaphodius mortuorum is a species of beetle of the family Scarabaeidae. It is found in China (Sichuan) and India (Sikkim).

== Description ==
Adults reach a length of about 5.5–7 mm (0.22–0.28 in). They have a widely oval, moderately convex body. The upper surface is dull, while the underside is shiny. The head and pronotum are glabrous, while the elytra have short hairs. They are brown-blackish, sometimes with brown elytra.
