= Tristaphodius =

Scientific classification
- Kingdom: Animalia
- Phylum: Arthropoda
- Clade: Pancrustacea
- Class: Insecta
- Order: Coleoptera
- Suborder: Polyphaga
- Infraorder: Scarabaeiformia
- Family: Scarabaeidae
- Subfamily: Aphodiinae
- Tribe: Aphodiini
- Genus: Tristaphodius; Balthasar, 1932

Synonyms
- Aphodius (Tristaphodius) Balthasar, 1932

Genus of beetles

Tristaphodius is a genus of beetles of the family Scarabaeidae.

== Species ==
- Tristaphodius asperulus (Červenka, 1994)
- Tristaphodius mortuorum (Balthasar, 1932)
