= Afrodiapterna heleninae =

Scientific classification
- Kingdom: Animalia
- Phylum: Arthropoda
- Clade: Pancrustacea
- Class: Insecta
- Order: Coleoptera
- Suborder: Polyphaga
- Infraorder: Scarabaeiformia
- Family: Scarabaeidae
- Genus: Afrodiapterna
- Species: A. heleninae

Binomial name
- Afrodiapterna heleninae (Dellacasa, 1984)

Synonyms
- Aphodius (Afrodiapterna) heleninae Dellacasa, 1984

Species of beetle

Afrodiapterna heleninae is a species of beetle of the family Scarabaeidae. It is found in Ivory Coast and Uganda.

== Description ==
Adults reach a length of about 5–6 mm (0.20–0.24 in). They have a shortly oval, strongly convex, moderately shiny, glabrous, blackish body, with the sides of the pronotum faintly reddish. The elytra have a pale red spot.
