= Afrodiapterna =

Scientific classification
- Kingdom: Animalia
- Phylum: Arthropoda
- Clade: Pancrustacea
- Class: Insecta
- Order: Coleoptera
- Suborder: Polyphaga
- Infraorder: Scarabaeiformia
- Family: Scarabaeidae
- Subfamily: Aphodiinae
- Tribe: Aphodiini
- Genus: Afrodiapterna; Dellacasa, 1984

Synonyms
- Aphodius (Afrodiapterna) Dellacasa, 1984

Genus of beetles

Afrodiapterna is a genus of beetles of the family Scarabaeidae.

== Species ==
- Afrodiapterna cambeforti (Dellacasa, 1984)
- Afrodiapterna heleninae (Dellacasa, 1984)
