= Cryptaphodius =

Scientific classification
- Kingdom: Animalia
- Phylum: Arthropoda
- Clade: Pancrustacea
- Class: Insecta
- Order: Coleoptera
- Suborder: Polyphaga
- Infraorder: Scarabaeiformia
- Family: Scarabaeidae
- Subfamily: Aphodiinae
- Tribe: Aphodiini
- Genus: Cryptaphodius; Bordat, 2009

Genus of beetles

Cryptaphodius is a genus of beetles of the family Scarabaeidae.

== Species ==
- Cryptaphodius entellus (Endrödi, 1967)
- Cryptaphodius excavatus (Schmidt, 1917)
