= Cryptaphodius excavatus =

Scientific classification
- Kingdom: Animalia
- Phylum: Arthropoda
- Clade: Pancrustacea
- Class: Insecta
- Order: Coleoptera
- Suborder: Polyphaga
- Infraorder: Scarabaeiformia
- Family: Scarabaeidae
- Genus: Cryptaphodius
- Species: C. excavatus

Binomial name
- Cryptaphodius excavatus (Schmidt, 1917)

Synonyms
- Aphodius (Loraphodius) excavatus Schmidt, 1917; Aphodius (Phaeaphodius) cavatus Boucomont, 1932

Species of beetle

Cryptaphodius excavatus is a species of beetle of the family Scarabaeidae. It is found in Cameroon, Guinea and Burundi.

== Description ==
Adults reach a length of about 5 mm (0.20 in). They have an elongate, nearly parallel-sided, slightly convex, shiny, glabrous, dark reddish-brown body, with the front of the head, the sides of the pronotum and the tips of the elytra lighter.
