= Hemicyclium =

Scientific classification
- Kingdom: Animalia
- Phylum: Arthropoda
- Clade: Pancrustacea
- Class: Insecta
- Order: Coleoptera
- Suborder: Polyphaga
- Infraorder: Scarabaeiformia
- Family: Scarabaeidae
- Subfamily: Aphodiinae
- Tribe: Aphodiini
- Genus: Hemicyclium; Schmidt, 1914

Synonyms
- Aphodius (Hemicyclium) Schmidt, 1914

Genus of beetles

Hemicyclium is a genus of beetles of the family Scarabaeidae.

== Species ==
- Hemicyclium lateritium (Roth, 1851)
- Hemicyclium unicornutum (Schmidt, 1909)
