= Hemicyclium unicornutum =

Scientific classification
- Kingdom: Animalia
- Phylum: Arthropoda
- Clade: Pancrustacea
- Class: Insecta
- Order: Coleoptera
- Suborder: Polyphaga
- Infraorder: Scarabaeiformia
- Family: Scarabaeidae
- Genus: Hemicyclium
- Species: H. unicornutum

Binomial name
- Hemicyclium unicornutum (Schmidt, 1909)

Synonyms
- Aphodius unicornutus Schmidt, 1909

Species of beetle

Hemicyclium unicornutum is a species of beetle of the family Scarabaeidae. It is found in Mozambique, the Democratic Republic of the Congo, Rwanda, Tanzania and Zimbabwe.

== Description ==
Adults reach a length of about 7.5–9 mm (0.30–0.35 in). They have a strongly convex, shiny, glabrous, bright brown-reddish body, with the front and the pronotum darker on the disc.
