= Qingaphodius =

Scientific classification
- Kingdom: Animalia
- Phylum: Arthropoda
- Clade: Pancrustacea
- Class: Insecta
- Order: Coleoptera
- Suborder: Polyphaga
- Infraorder: Scarabaeiformia
- Family: Scarabaeidae
- Subfamily: Aphodiinae
- Tribe: Aphodiini
- Genus: Qingaphodius; Král, 1997

Synonyms
- Aphodius (Qingaphodius) Král, 1997

Genus of beetles

Qingaphodius is a genus of beetles of the family Scarabaeidae.

== Species ==
- Qingaphodius nikodymi (Král, 1997)
- Qingaphodius ochotonarum (Král, 1997)
