= Qingaphodius nikodymi =

Scientific classification
- Kingdom: Animalia
- Phylum: Arthropoda
- Clade: Pancrustacea
- Class: Insecta
- Order: Coleoptera
- Suborder: Polyphaga
- Infraorder: Scarabaeiformia
- Family: Scarabaeidae
- Genus: Qingaphodius
- Species: Q. nikodymi

Binomial name
- Qingaphodius nikodymi (Král, 1997)

Synonyms
- Aphodius (Qingaphodius) nikodymi Král, 1997

Species of beetle

Qingaphodius nikodymi is a species of beetle of the family Scarabaeidae. It is found in China (Qinghai).

== Description ==
Adults reach a length of about 6.5–7.5 mm (0.26–0.30 in). They have an oval-elongate, moderately convex, shiny, glabrous, dark chestnut-brown body, with the margin of the clypeus and the elytra paler. The legs are brown-reddish and the antennal club is piceous.
