= Drepanocanthus =

Scientific classification
- Kingdom: Animalia
- Phylum: Arthropoda
- Clade: Pancrustacea
- Class: Insecta
- Order: Coleoptera
- Suborder: Polyphaga
- Infraorder: Scarabaeiformia
- Family: Scarabaeidae
- Subfamily: Aphodiinae
- Tribe: Aphodiini
- Genus: Drepanocanthus; Péringuey, 1901

Genus of beetles

Drepanocanthus is a genus of beetles of the family Scarabaeidae.

== Species ==
- Drepanocanthus lineatus (Wiedemann, 1823)
- Drepanocanthus mineti Bordat, 1993
