= Drepanocanthus lineatus =

Scientific classification
- Kingdom: Animalia
- Phylum: Arthropoda
- Clade: Pancrustacea
- Class: Insecta
- Order: Coleoptera
- Suborder: Polyphaga
- Infraorder: Scarabaeiformia
- Family: Scarabaeidae
- Genus: Drepanocanthus
- Species: D. lineatus

Binomial name
- Drepanocanthus lineatus (Wiedemann, 1823)

Synonyms
- Aphodius lineatus Wiedemann, 1823; Drepanocanthus acanthotarsis Péringuey, 1901

Species of beetle

Drepanocanthus lineatus is a species of beetle of the family Scarabaeidae. It is found in South Africa (Cape) and Zimbabwe.

== Description ==
Adults reach a length of about 4–5.5 mm (0.16–0.22 in). They have an elongate, moderately convex, shiny, pubescent, brown-blackish body, with the lateral margin of the pronotum and elytra pale brown and the legs testaceous.
