= Cnemargulus =

Scientific classification
- Kingdom: Animalia
- Phylum: Arthropoda
- Clade: Pancrustacea
- Class: Insecta
- Order: Coleoptera
- Suborder: Polyphaga
- Infraorder: Scarabaeiformia
- Family: Scarabaeidae
- Subfamily: Aphodiinae
- Tribe: Aphodiini
- Genus: Cnemargulus; Semenov, 1903

Genus of beetles

Cnemargulus is a genus of beetles of the family Scarabaeidae.

== Species ==
- Cnemargulus alkhubraicus Pittino, 1984
- Cnemargulus krulikovskyi Semenov, 1903
