= Cnemargulus krulikovskyi =

Scientific classification
- Kingdom: Animalia
- Phylum: Arthropoda
- Clade: Pancrustacea
- Class: Insecta
- Order: Coleoptera
- Suborder: Polyphaga
- Infraorder: Scarabaeiformia
- Family: Scarabaeidae
- Genus: Cnemargulus
- Species: C. krulikovskyi

Binomial name
- Cnemargulus krulikovskyi Semenov, 1903

Synonyms
- Cnemargulus pusio Semenov, 1903

Species of beetle

Cnemargulus krulikovskyi is a species of beetle of the family Scarabaeidae. It is found in Turkmenistan, Kyrgyzstan and Uzbekistan.

== Description ==
Adults reach a length of about 4–5 mm (0.16–0.20 in). They have an oval, convex, shiny, glabrous, testaceous body, with the head, pronotum, legs and sutural margin of the elytra brownish.
