= Renaudius tesari =

Scientific classification
- Kingdom: Animalia
- Phylum: Arthropoda
- Clade: Pancrustacea
- Class: Insecta
- Order: Coleoptera
- Suborder: Polyphaga
- Infraorder: Scarabaeiformia
- Family: Scarabaeidae
- Genus: Renaudius
- Species: R. tesari

Binomial name
- Renaudius tesari (Paulian, 1942)

Synonyms
- Heptaulacus tesari Paulian, 1942

Species of beetle

Renaudius tesari is a species of beetle of the family Scarabaeidae. It is found in China (Chongqing, Sichuan, Yunnan).

== Description ==
Adults reach a length of about 3–4 mm (0.12–0.16 in). They have an oval-elongate, moderately convex, dull, nearly glabrous, piceous body, with the margin of the clypeus and the front angles of the pronotum reddish, the antennal club testaceous and the legs reddish.
