= Renaudius =

Scientific classification
- Kingdom: Animalia
- Phylum: Arthropoda
- Clade: Pancrustacea
- Class: Insecta
- Order: Coleoptera
- Suborder: Polyphaga
- Infraorder: Scarabaeiformia
- Family: Scarabaeidae
- Subfamily: Aphodiinae
- Tribe: Aphodiini
- Genus: Renaudius; Balthasar, 1951

Genus of beetles

Renaudius is a genus of beetles of the family Scarabaeidae.

== Species ==
- Renaudius tesari (Paulian, 1942)
- Renaudius thailandicus Masumoto, 1991
