= Harmodactylus oscitans =

Scientific classification
- Kingdom: Animalia
- Phylum: Arthropoda
- Clade: Pancrustacea
- Class: Insecta
- Order: Coleoptera
- Suborder: Polyphaga
- Infraorder: Scarabaeiformia
- Family: Scarabaeidae
- Genus: Harmodactylus
- Species: H. oscitans

Binomial name
- Harmodactylus oscitans Péringuey, 1901

Species of beetle

Harmodactylus oscitans is a species of beetle of the family Scarabaeidae. It is found in South Africa (Western Cape).

== Description ==
Adults reach a length of about 5.5–6 mm (0.22–0.24 in). They have a convex, shiny, nearly glabrous body. There are fine and short hairs on the elytra laterally and apically. They are dark brown-reddish, with the clypeus, pronotum and elytral margins paler. The club of the antennae is piceous.
