= Harmodactylus =

Scientific classification
- Kingdom: Animalia
- Phylum: Arthropoda
- Clade: Pancrustacea
- Class: Insecta
- Order: Coleoptera
- Suborder: Polyphaga
- Infraorder: Scarabaeiformia
- Family: Scarabaeidae
- Subfamily: Aphodiinae
- Tribe: Aphodiini
- Genus: Harmodactylus; Péringuey, 1901

Genus of beetles

Harmodactylus is a genus of beetles of the family Scarabaeidae.

== Species ==
- Harmodactylus oscitans Péringuey, 1901
- Harmodactylus solus (Bordat, 1990)
