= Pseudomothon arabicus =

Scientific classification
- Kingdom: Animalia
- Phylum: Arthropoda
- Clade: Pancrustacea
- Class: Insecta
- Order: Coleoptera
- Suborder: Polyphaga
- Infraorder: Scarabaeiformia
- Family: Scarabaeidae
- Genus: Pseudomothon
- Species: P. arabicus

Binomial name
- Pseudomothon arabicus Pittino, 1984

Species of beetle

Pseudomothon arabicus is a species of beetle of the family Scarabaeidae. It is found in Saudi Arabia.

== Description ==
Adults reach a length of about 5 mm (0.20 in). They have an elongate, nearly parallel-sided, slightly convex, almost dull, yellowish body. The margin of the clypeus, sides of the pronotum and elytral suture are red-brownish, the legs are testaceous and the antennal club is pale yellow.
