= Pseudomothon =

Scientific classification
- Kingdom: Animalia
- Phylum: Arthropoda
- Clade: Pancrustacea
- Class: Insecta
- Order: Coleoptera
- Suborder: Polyphaga
- Infraorder: Scarabaeiformia
- Family: Scarabaeidae
- Subfamily: Aphodiinae
- Tribe: Aphodiini
- Genus: Pseudomothon; Pittino, 1984

Genus of beetles

Pseudomothon is a genus of beetles of the family Scarabaeidae.

== Species ==
- Pseudomothon arabicus Pittino, 1984
- Pseudomothon pittinoi Král, 2017
