= Sybax sulcicollis =

Scientific classification
- Kingdom: Animalia
- Phylum: Arthropoda
- Clade: Pancrustacea
- Class: Insecta
- Order: Coleoptera
- Suborder: Polyphaga
- Infraorder: Scarabaeiformia
- Family: Scarabaeidae
- Genus: Sybax
- Species: S. sulcicollis

Binomial name
- Sybax sulcicollis Boheman, 1857

Species of beetle

Sybax sulcicollis is a species of beetle of the family Scarabaeidae. It is found in Tanzania and Zimbabwe.

== Description ==
Adults reach a length of about 7.5–11 mm (0.30–0.43 in). They have an oblong, moderately convex, dull, nearly glabrous, yellowish body. The scutellum and part of the legs are dark brownish.
