= Sybax =

Scientific classification
- Kingdom: Animalia
- Phylum: Arthropoda
- Clade: Pancrustacea
- Class: Insecta
- Order: Coleoptera
- Suborder: Polyphaga
- Infraorder: Scarabaeiformia
- Family: Scarabaeidae
- Subfamily: Aphodiinae
- Tribe: Aphodiini
- Genus: Sybax; Boheman, 1857

Synonyms
- Hypoplatys Harold, 1859

Genus of beetles

Sybax is a genus of beetles of the family Scarabaeidae.

== Species ==
- Sybax distortus Schmidt, 1920
- Sybax impressicollis Boheman, 1857
- Sybax sulcicollis Boheman, 1857
