= Goiginus howdeni =

Scientific classification
- Kingdom: Animalia
- Phylum: Arthropoda
- Clade: Pancrustacea
- Class: Insecta
- Order: Coleoptera
- Suborder: Polyphaga
- Infraorder: Scarabaeiformia
- Family: Scarabaeidae
- Genus: Goiginus
- Species: G. howdeni

Binomial name
- Goiginus howdeni Endrödi, 1982

Species of beetle

Goiginus howdeni is a species of beetle of the family Scarabaeidae. It is found in South Africa (KwaZulu-Natal).

== Description ==
Adults reach a length of about 3.5–4 mm (0.14–0.16 in). They have an elongate, moderately convex, shiny, glabrous, dark brown-yellowish body, with the margin of the clypeus and front angles of the pronotum paler. The legs are yellowish and the antennal club is brownish.
