= Goiginus =

Scientific classification
- Kingdom: Animalia
- Phylum: Arthropoda
- Clade: Pancrustacea
- Class: Insecta
- Order: Coleoptera
- Suborder: Polyphaga
- Infraorder: Scarabaeiformia
- Family: Scarabaeidae
- Subfamily: Aphodiinae
- Tribe: Aphodiini
- Genus: Goiginus; Endrödi, 1982

Genus of beetles

Goiginus is a genus of beetles of the family Scarabaeidae.

== Species ==
- Goiginus howdeni Endrödi, 1982
- Goiginus zumpti (Petrovitz, 1967)
