= Acromyrmex pubescens =

Scientific classification
- Kingdom: Animalia
- Phylum: Arthropoda
- Clade: Pancrustacea
- Class: Insecta
- Order: Hymenoptera
- Family: Formicidae
- Subfamily: Myrmicinae
- Genus: Acromyrmex
- Species: A. pubescens

Binomial name
- Acromyrmex pubescens (Emery, 1905)

Species of ant

Acromyrmex pubescens is a species of leafcutter ants of the subfamily Myrmicinae. They are native to Paraguay, northern Argentina, and eastern Brazil.

== Taxonomy ==
Acromyrmex pubescens was first described as Atta (Acromyrmex) pubescens by the Italian entomologist Carlo Emery in 1905. Starting from Felix Santschi in 1912, subsequent studies have classified it as a subspecies of Acromyrmex lundii, until a reexamination in 2007 resulted in their reclassification as a separate species. It is similar to A. lundii but has more pubescent integument.

== Ecology ==
Acromyrmex pubescens, like most leafcutter ants, subsist mostly through a mutualistic relationship with fungi of the genus Leucocoprinus. They cultivate the fungi with masticated leaves taken from nearby trees. They are mostly found in isolated 'islands' of trees found in chaco savannahs.

== See also ==
- List of leafcutter ants
