= Acromyrmex biscutatus =

Scientific classification
- Kingdom: Animalia
- Phylum: Arthropoda
- Class: Insecta
- Order: Hymenoptera
- Family: Formicidae
- Subfamily: Myrmicinae
- Genus: Acromyrmex
- Species: A. biscutatus

Binomial name
- Acromyrmex biscutatus Fabricius, 1775

Species of ant

Acromyrmex biscutatus is a species of leaf-cutter ant, a New World ant of the subfamily Myrmicinae of the genus Acromyrmex.

== Synonyms ==
Formica biscutata Fabricius

== See also ==
- List of leafcutter ants
