= Acromyrmex evenkul =

Scientific classification
- Kingdom: Animalia
- Phylum: Arthropoda
- Class: Insecta
- Order: Hymenoptera
- Family: Formicidae
- Subfamily: Myrmicinae
- Genus: Acromyrmex
- Species: A. evenkul

Binomial name
- Acromyrmex evenkul Bolton, 1995

Species of ant

Acromyrmex evenkul is a species of leaf-cutter ant, a New World ant of the subfamily Myrmicinae of the genus Acromyrmex. This species is from one of the two genera of advanced attines (fungus-growing ants) within the tribe Attini.

== Synonyms ==
- Acromyrmex gallardoi Santschi, 1936
- Sericomyrmex gallardoi Santschi, 1920

== See also ==
- List of leafcutter ants
