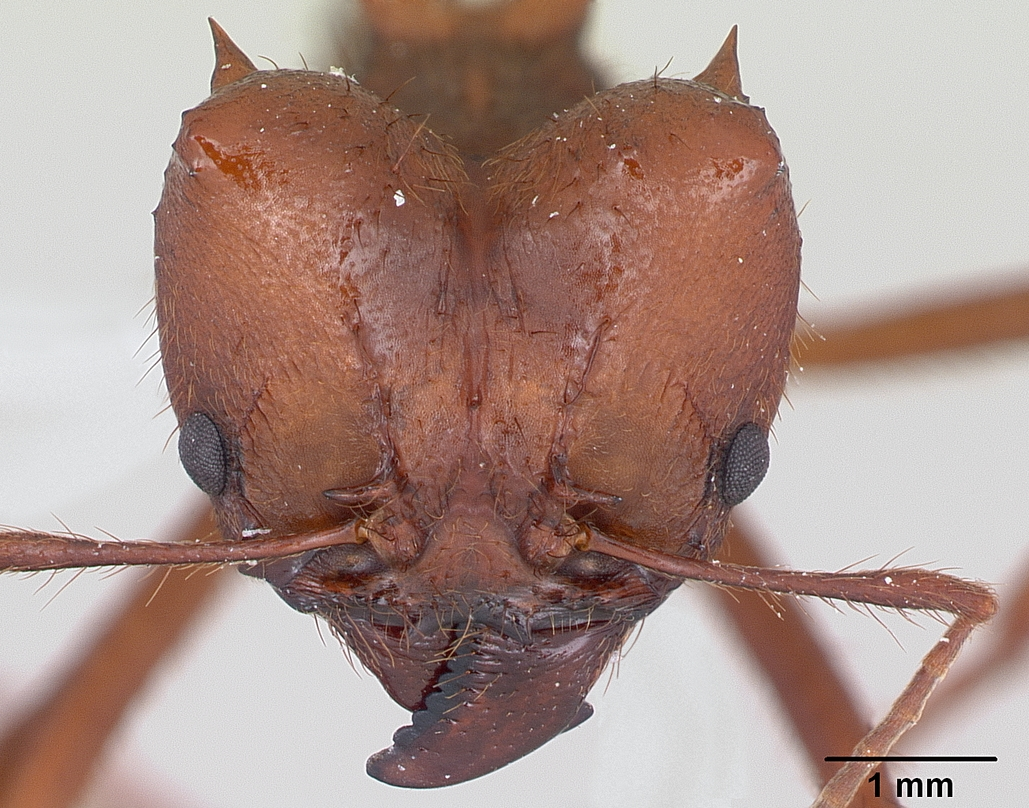

Scientific classification
- Kingdom: Animalia
- Phylum: Arthropoda
- Clade: Pancrustacea
- Class: Insecta
- Order: Hymenoptera
- Family: Formicidae
- Subfamily: Myrmicinae
- Genus: Atta
- Species: A. vollenweideri

Binomial name
- Atta vollenweideri (Forel, 1893)

= Atta vollenweideri =

Species of ant

Atta vollenweideri, common name chaco leafcutter ant, is a species of leafcutter ant, a New World ant of the subfamily Myrmicinae of the genus Atta. This species is from one of the two genera of advanced attines (fungus-growing ants) within the tribe Attini.

Colonies are made up of around 4-7 million individuals.

== See also ==
- List of leafcutter ants
