= Acromyrmex hystrix =

Scientific classification
- Kingdom: Animalia
- Phylum: Arthropoda
- Clade: Pancrustacea
- Class: Insecta
- Order: Hymenoptera
- Family: Formicidae
- Subfamily: Myrmicinae
- Genus: Acromyrmex
- Species: A. hystrix

Binomial name
- Acromyrmex hystrix Latreille, 1802

Synonyms
- Acromyrmex emilii Santschi, 1925; Atta hystrix Latreille, 1802; Formica hystrix Latreille, 1802

Species of ant

Acromyrmex hystrix is a species of leafcutter ant of the genus Acromyrmex. This species can be found in regions including the Amazon and Ecuador.

There are two subspecies of this myrmicine New World ant:

- Acromyrmex hystrix ajax Santschi, 1925
- Acromyrmex hystrix hystrix Latreille, 1802

== See also ==
- List of leafcutter ants
