= List of leafcutter ants =

This is a list of leafcutter ants, comprising 42 species from three genera: Atta, Amoimyrmex and Acromyrmex.

Species	Image	Common name	Distribution
Atta bisphaerica			
Atta capiguara			
Atta cephalotes			
Atta colombica			Guatemala to Colombia, Costa Rica
Atta insularis			Occurs only in Cuba
Atta laevigata		Hormiga culona, bachaco	from Colombia to Paraguay
Atta mexicana			Mexico crossing into Arizona
Atta opaciceps			
Atta robusta			
Atta saltensis			
Atta sexdens			southern United States to northern Argentina
Atta silvai			
Atta texana		Town ant, parasol ant, fungus ant, Texas leafcutter ant, cut ant, night ant	Texas, Louisiana, northeastern states of Mexico
Atta vollenweideri			
Acromyrmex ameliae			southern Brazil
Acromyrmex ambiguus		Quenquém-preto-brilhante	Brazil, Paraguay, Uruguay
Acromyrmex aspersus		Quenquém-rajada	southern Brazil and Peru
Acromyrmex balzani			eastern Paraguay and southern Brazil
Acromyrmex coronatus		Quenquém-de-árvore	Guatemala to Brazil and Ecuador
Acromyrmex crassispinus		Quenquém-de-cisco	throughout South America, especially in Argentina and Paraguay
Acromyrmex diasi		Quenquém-mirime, formiga-carregadeira	Brazil
Acromyrmex disciger		Quenquém-mirime, formiga-carregadeira	Paraguay
Acromyrmex fracticornis			southern Brazil, Paraguay, and northern Argentina
Acromyrmex heyeri		Formiga-de-monte-vermelha	Paraguay, Argentina, Brazil, and Uruguay
Acromyrmex hispidus		Formiga-mineira (A. h. fallax), quenquém-de-cisco-da-Amazônia	southern Brazil and Bolivia
Acromyrmex hystrix		Quenquém-de-cisco-da-Amazônia	Amazon and Ecuador.
Acromyrmex landolti		Boca-de-cisco (A. l. balzani), formiga rapa-rapa (A. l. balzani), formiga-rapa (A. l. balzani), formiga meia-lua (A. l. balzani), formiga-mineira (A. l. fracticornis, A. l. landolti), formiga-mineira-vermelha (A. l. fracticornis, A. l. landolti)	
Acromyrmex laticeps		Formiga-mineira (A. l. laticeps), formiga-mineira-vermelha (A. l. laticeps), quenquém-campeira (A. l. migrosetosus)	
Acromyrmex lobicornis		Quenquém-de-monte-preta	
Acromyrmex lundii		Hormigas jardineras, hormiga negra, formiga-mineira (A. l. pubescens), formiga-mineira-preta, quenquém-mineira (A. l. carli, A. l. lundi); Quenquém mineira-preta (A. l. carli, A. l. lundi)	Brazil, northern Argentina, and Paraguay
Acromyrmex mesopotamicus			
Acromyrmex niger		Carieira, quenquém-mineira-da-Amazônia	Brazil, Paraguay
Acromyrmex nigrosetosus			
Acromyrmex nobilis		Carieira, quenquém-mineira-da-Amazônia	
Acromyrmex octospinosus		Bachaco sabanero, carieira, quenquém-mineira-da-Amazônia	southern Mexico to Panama, across northern South America in Venezuela
Acromyrmex pulvereus			
Acromyrmex rugosus		Formiga-quiçaçá (A. r. rochai), saúva (A. r. rugosus), formiga-lavradeira (A. r. rugosus), formiga-mulatinha (A. r. rugosus)	
Acromyrmex silvestrii			
Acromyrmex striatus		Formiga-de-rodeio, formiga-de-eira	
Acromyrmex subterraneus		Quenquém-de-cisco-graúda (A. s. bruneus), quenquém-caiapó-capixaba (A. s. molestans), caiapó (A. s. subterraneus)	
Acromyrmex versicolor			
Acromyrmex volcanus			
