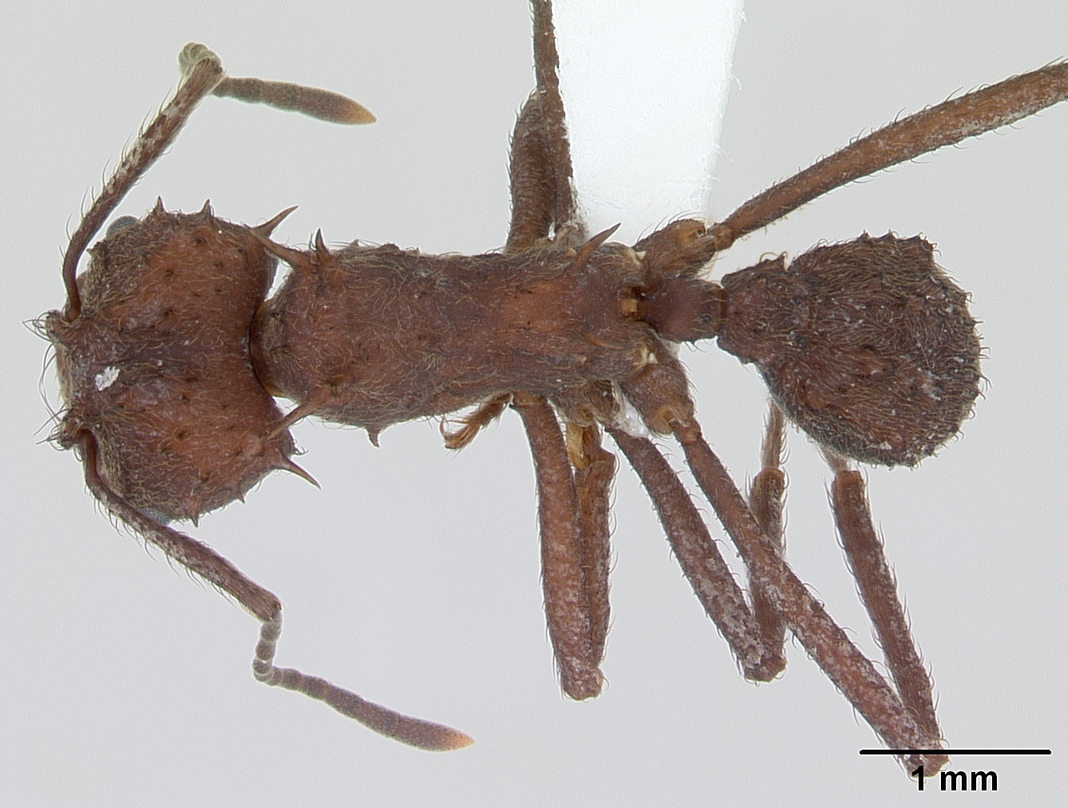

Scientific classification
- Kingdom: Animalia
- Phylum: Arthropoda
- Clade: Pancrustacea
- Class: Insecta
- Order: Hymenoptera
- Family: Formicidae
- Subfamily: Myrmicinae
- Genus: Acromyrmex
- Species: A. crassispinus

Binomial name
- Acromyrmex crassispinus Forel, 1909

= Acromyrmex crassispinus =

Species of ant

Acromyrmex crassispinus is a species of leaf-cutter ant, a New World ant of the subfamily Myrmicinae found in the wild naturally throughout South America, especially in southern Brazil.

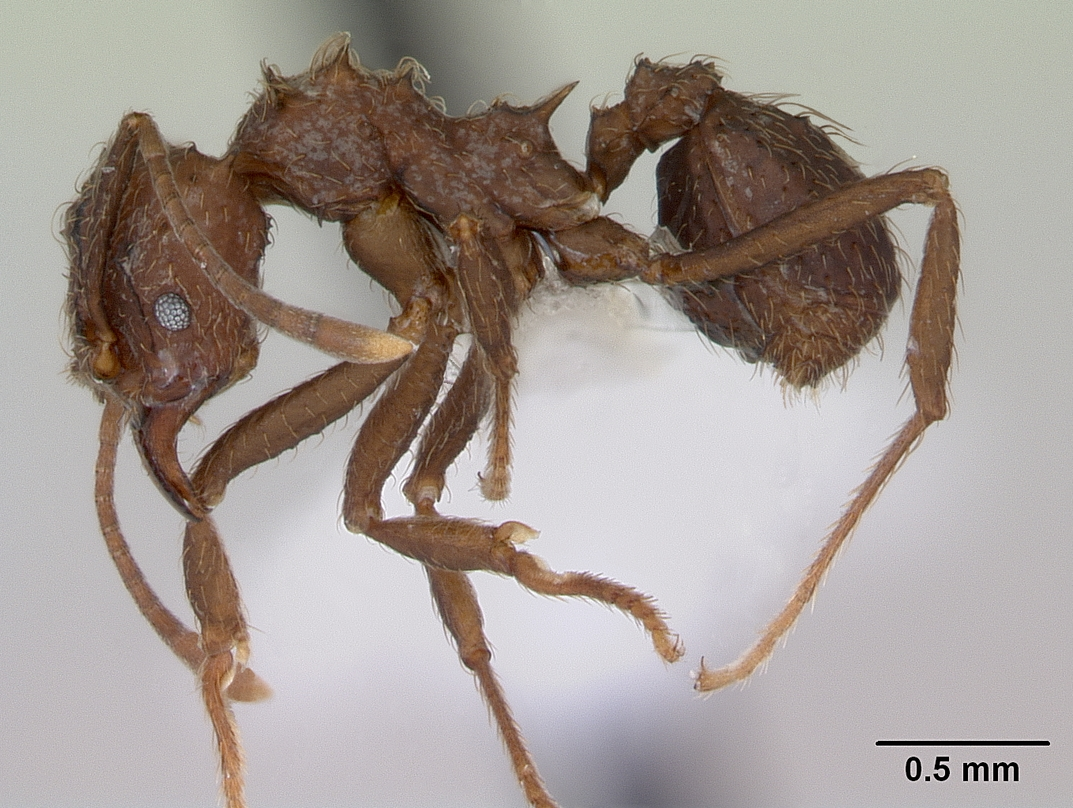
Profile view of ant A. crassispinus specimen

Acromyrmex crassispinus is black-brown in colour; the queen is 10 – 12 mm in length.

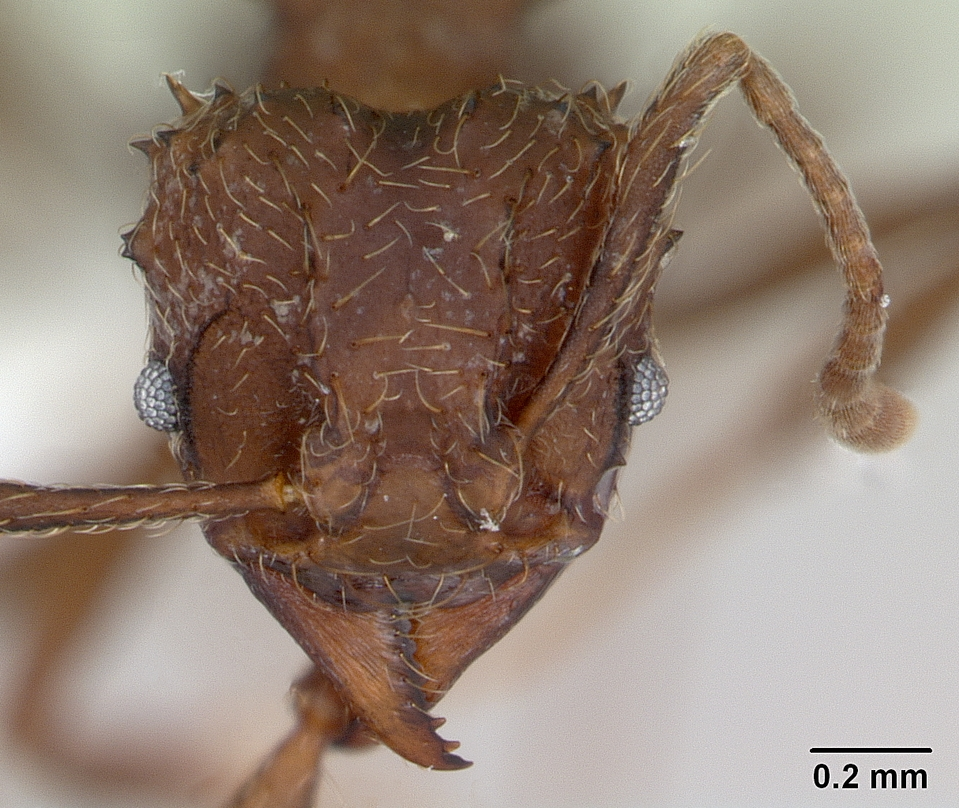
Head view of ant A. crassispinus specimen

== Other names ==
- Acromyrmex atratus Gonçalves, 1961
- A. diabolica Gonçalves, 1961
- A. insularis Gonçalves, 1961
- A. mediocris Gonçalves, 1961
- A. mesonotalis Forel, 1909
- A. rufescens Gonçalves, 1961
- A. rusticus Gonçalves, 1961

== See also ==
- List of leafcutter ants
