= Atta robusta =

Scientific classification
- Kingdom: Animalia
- Phylum: Arthropoda
- Class: Insecta
- Order: Hymenoptera
- Family: Formicidae
- Subfamily: Myrmicinae
- Genus: Atta
- Species: A. robusta

Binomial name
- Atta robusta Borgmeier, 1939

Species of ant

Atta robusta is a species of leafcutter ant, a New World ant of the subfamily Myrmicinae of the genus Atta.

== See also ==
- List of leafcutter ants
