= Atta opaciceps =

Scientific classification
- Kingdom: Animalia
- Phylum: Arthropoda
- Clade: Pancrustacea
- Class: Insecta
- Order: Hymenoptera
- Family: Formicidae
- Subfamily: Myrmicinae
- Genus: Atta
- Species: A. opaciceps

Binomial name
- Atta opaciceps (Borgmeier, 1939)

Species of ant

Atta opaciceps is a species of leaf-cutter ant, a New World ant of the subfamily Myrmicinae of the genus Atta.

== See also ==
- List of leafcutter ants
