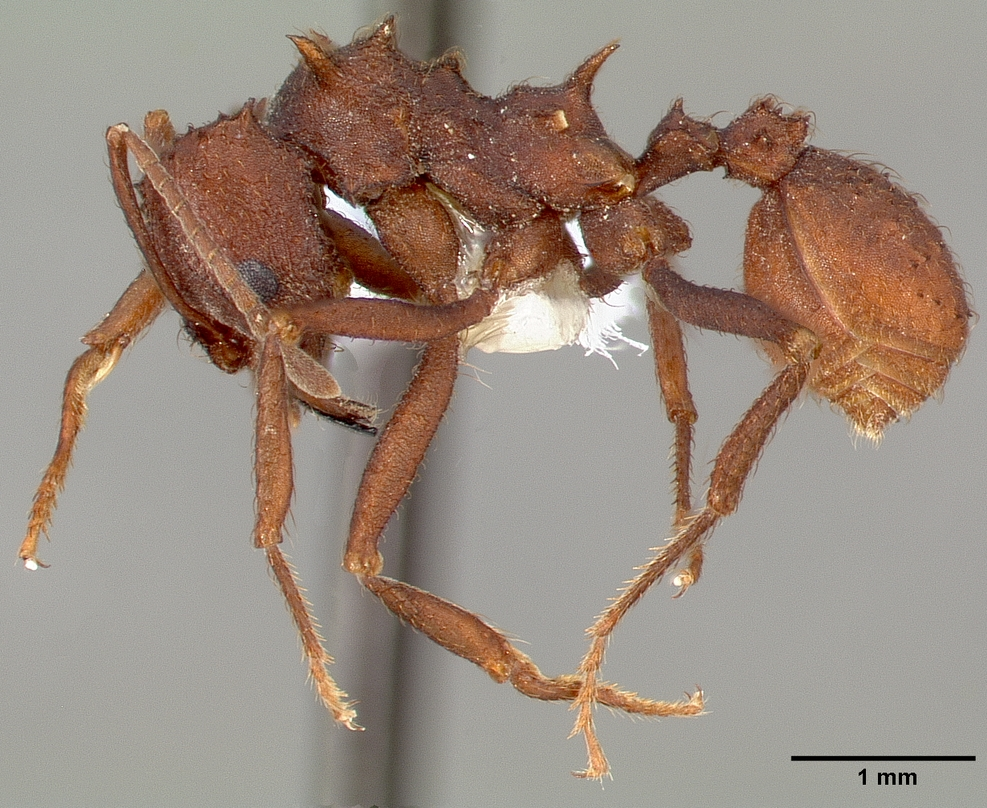
- Acromyrmex versicolor worker

Scientific classification
- Kingdom: Animalia
- Phylum: Arthropoda
- Clade: Pancrustacea
- Class: Insecta
- Order: Hymenoptera
- Family: Formicidae
- Subfamily: Myrmicinae
- Genus: Acromyrmex
- Species: A. versicolor

Binomial name
- Acromyrmex versicolor Pergande, 1894

= Acromyrmex versicolor =

Species of ant

Acromyrmex versicolor is known as the desert leafcutter ant. A. versicolor is found during the summer months in the Colorado and Sonoran deserts when there is precipitation. They form large, distinctive nest craters that are covered with leaf fragments. Living and dead leaves are collected by workers and used to cultivate fungus gardens. Each colony can have multiple queens, if they do this is a practice called polygyny, and each queen has her own batch of “starter” fungus. This species does not sting.

== Identification ==
The average worker is 2–6 mm long. Individuals of A. versicolor are a variety of sizes due to the division of labour seen within their colony. They are reddish brown and have a narrow waist. They are also covered in spines; at least 4 spines on the rear of their thorax, distinct spines on the rear corners of their head, and small bumps on their abdomen.

== Mating ==
Acromyrmex versicolor mate from late July through October. All major mating flights are preceded by a day of rain. Mating flights begin in the early morning when individuals of both sexes emerge from the colony. Males will leave for the mating sites first, followed by the females who likely follow male pheromones. Males will grapple the female in mid-air then fall to the ground to copulate.

Polyandrous mating has the potential to reduce the genetic relatedness of individuals within a colony, which may have a profound effect on the colony's stability and social structure. Up to nine males have been reported surrounding a single female. Females have also been known to mate with multiple males. Females will often mate with up to three or four different males even though one mating is sufficient to fill the spermatheca. Genetic analysis of paternity of offspring of females who mated with multiple males showed that each male had relatively equal amounts of offspring. This shows that the sperm is mixed within the spermatheca and that females have little to no control over which sperm fertilize her eggs.

== Effects of temperature ==
The foraging habits of A . versicolor are strongly influenced by temperature. During the cooler spring and fall months, A. versicolor have diurnal foraging activity. During the hotter summer months, they tend to forage more at night when the soil temperatures are cooler. When temperatures are their hottest and individuals find themselves stranded away from the nest, they will find a cooler surface such as a rock and press their body against it to try and lose heat. The ideal foraging temperatures of A. versicolor vary from 12 °C to 42 °C.

Temperature also plays a role in how deep a queen will make her nest. Nests have to be made at a depth below where lethal temperatures occur (below 5 cm). Building nests under trees allows colonies to remain below lethal temperatures and also does not require them to be so deep (2–3 cm). Having a nest under a tree also allows colonies to be closer to food sources such as leaves.

== Foraging ==
Acromyrmex versicolor use trails to forage in groups like most higher attines, but also forage alone which is a characteristic of more primitive leafcutter ants. They forage for both green vegetation and dry grasses, but dry grasses make up the bulk of their forage. A. versicolor will increase the amount of fresh vegetation they collect after significant amounts of rainfall, but will collect dry grasses during drier periods.

The amount an individual ant forages or the efficiency to which each ant forages may be due to each ones genetics and may vary significantly between matrilines. Younger ants most often spend their time tending to the nest while older ants will go out and forage. The age at which a young ant will switch to foraging also seems to be genetically predisposed.

== See also ==
- List of leafcutter ants
