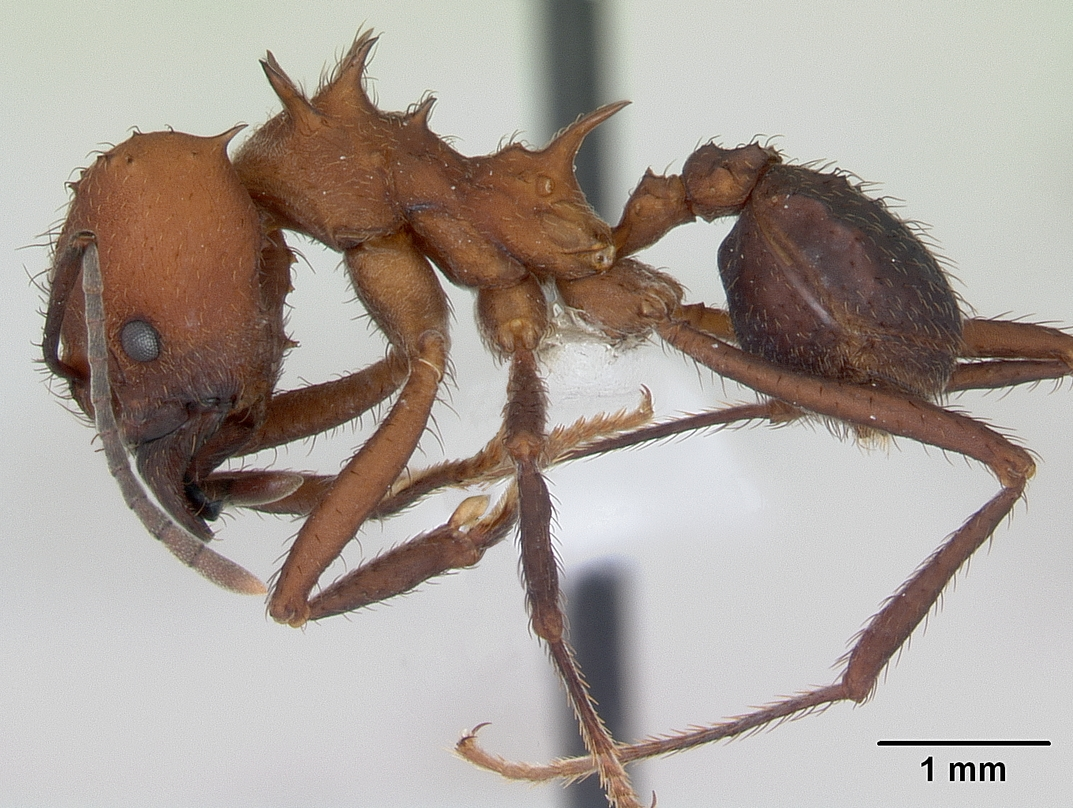

Scientific classification
- Kingdom: Animalia
- Phylum: Arthropoda
- Clade: Pancrustacea
- Class: Insecta
- Order: Hymenoptera
- Family: Formicidae
- Subfamily: Myrmicinae
- Genus: Acromyrmex
- Species: A. heyeri

Binomial name
- Acromyrmex heyeri Forel, 1899

= Acromyrmex heyeri =

Species of ant

Acromyrmex heyeri is a species of leaf-cutter ant, a New World ant of the subfamily Myrmicinae of the genus Acromyrmex.

== Distribution ==
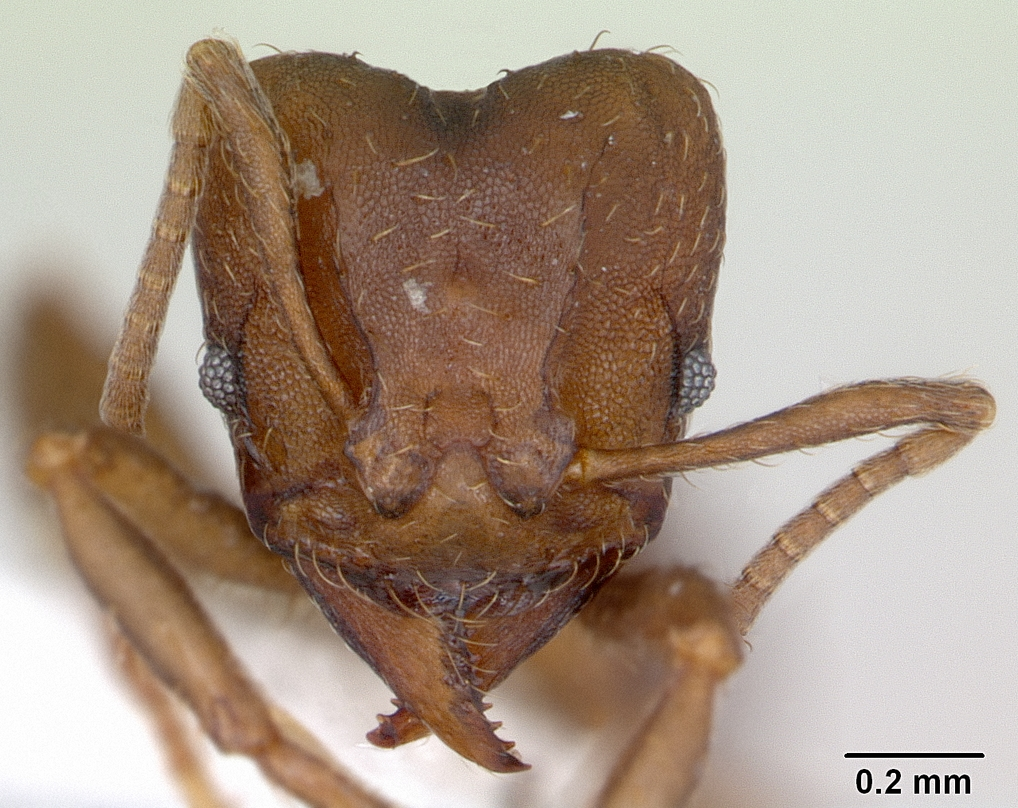
Head view of ant Acromyrmex heyeri specimen.

This species is found in Paraguay, Argentina, Brazil, and Uruguay.

== Description ==
Acromyrmex heyeri workers construct the colonies nest by thatching together cut grass. At temperatures ranging from 20 to 30 °C, workers created more openings in the nest thatch as the internal nest temperature goes up as a method of temperature regulation for the colony. The workers will close openings in the nest thatch as the air humidity surrounding the nest decreases to reduce water loss for the colony.

Studies using isoenzyme systems MDH, a-GPDH, and AMY show the occurrence of monogyny and polygyny associated or not with polyandry, which indicates that the social organization is colony-specific. The polygyny and polyandry observed are likely to be responsible for the great genotypic diversity of the species colonies. The average inbreeding coefficient per colony is higher in Acromyrmex striatus than in Acromyrmex heyeri, which may reflect the different patterns of production of sexual individuals and nuptial flight of those two species.

== Synonyms ==
- Acromyrmex gaudens Fowler, 1988
- Acromyrmex lillensis Fowler, 1988
- Moellerius heyeri Forel, 1899

== See also ==
- List of leafcutter ants
