= Atta bisphaerica =

Scientific classification
- Kingdom: Animalia
- Phylum: Arthropoda
- Clade: Pancrustacea
- Class: Insecta
- Order: Hymenoptera
- Family: Formicidae
- Subfamily: Myrmicinae
- Genus: Atta
- Species: A. bisphaerica

Binomial name
- Atta bisphaerica (Forel, 1908)

Species of ant

Atta bisphaerica is a species of leafcutter ant, a New World ant of the subfamily Myrmicinae of the genus Atta endemic to Brazil.

== See also ==
- List of leafcutter ants
