= Acromyrmex hispidus =

Scientific classification
- Kingdom: Animalia
- Phylum: Arthropoda
- Clade: Pancrustacea
- Class: Insecta
- Order: Hymenoptera
- Family: Formicidae
- Subfamily: Myrmicinae
- Genus: Acromyrmex
- Species: A. hispidus

Binomial name
- Acromyrmex hispidus Santschi, 1925

Species of ant

Acromyrmex hispidus is a species of leaf-cutter ant, a New World ant of the subfamily Myrmicinae of the genus Acromyrmex. It is found in the wild in southern Brazil and Bolivia.

== Subspecies ==
Felix Santschi described the following subspecies:

- Acromyrmex hispidus fallax Santschi, 1925
- Acromyrmex hispidus formosus Santschi, 1925
- Acromyrmex hispidus hispidus Santschi, 1925

== See also ==
- List of leafcutter ants
