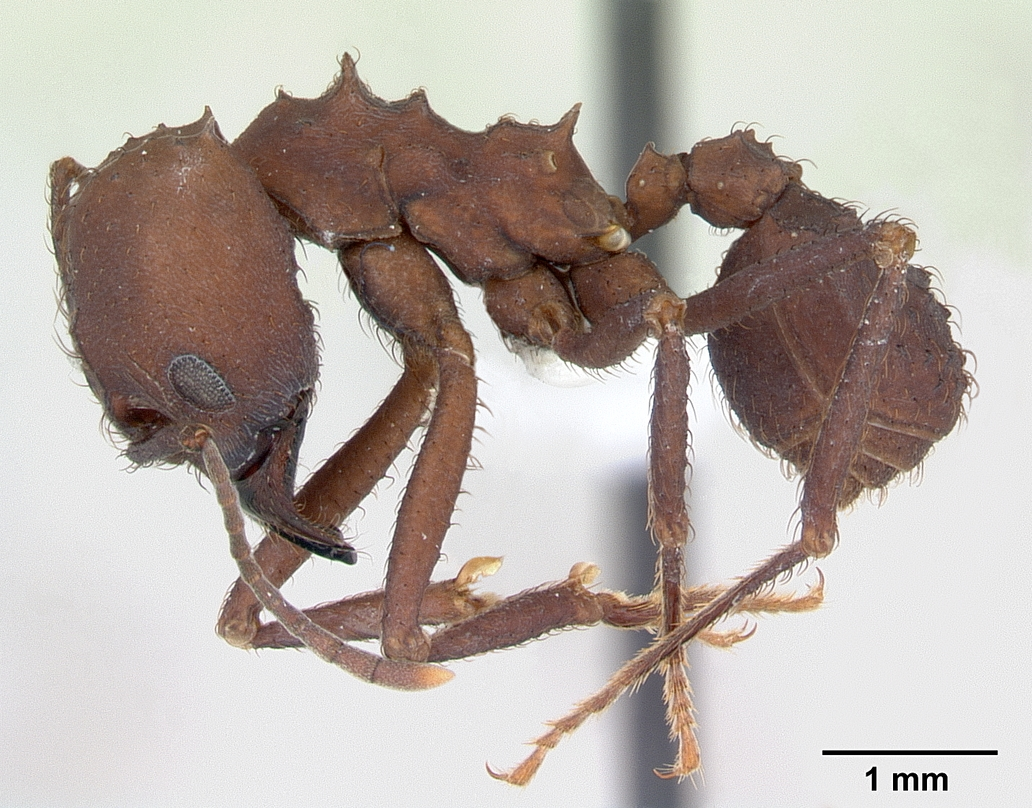
- Profile view of an A. balzani worker

Scientific classification
- Kingdom: Animalia
- Phylum: Arthropoda
- Clade: Pancrustacea
- Class: Insecta
- Order: Hymenoptera
- Family: Formicidae
- Subfamily: Myrmicinae
- Genus: Acromyrmex
- Species: A. balzani

Binomial name
- Acromyrmex balzani (Emery, 1890)

Synonyms
- Atta balzani Emery, 1890; Acromyrmex gallardoi Santschi, 1922; Acromyrmex nivalis Fowler, 1988; Acromyrmex parens Gonçalves, 1961

= Acromyrmex balzani =

Species of ant

Acromyrmex balzani is a species of leaf-cutter ant of the subfamily Myrmicinae. It is found Argentina, Paraguay, and Brazil. It occurs in Cerrado and semideciduous seasonal forest. It is a grass-cutting species.

== Subspecies ==
In addition to the nominotypical subspecies, one subspecies is recognized:

- Acromyrmex balzani multituber Santschi, 1922 – Bolivia

== Colony structure ==
A colony of Acromyrmex balzani consists of several subnests (i.e., polydomy), with one queen each. The underground nests contain 1–14 fungus chambers and can reach a depth of at least 160 cm (63.0 in). There are no waste chambers; the waste is deposited outside the nest.

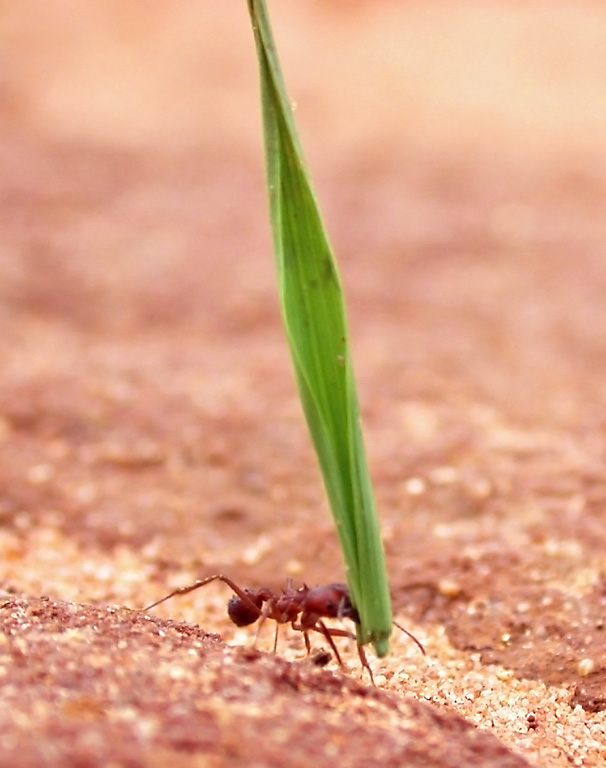
A. balzani worker carrying a leaf

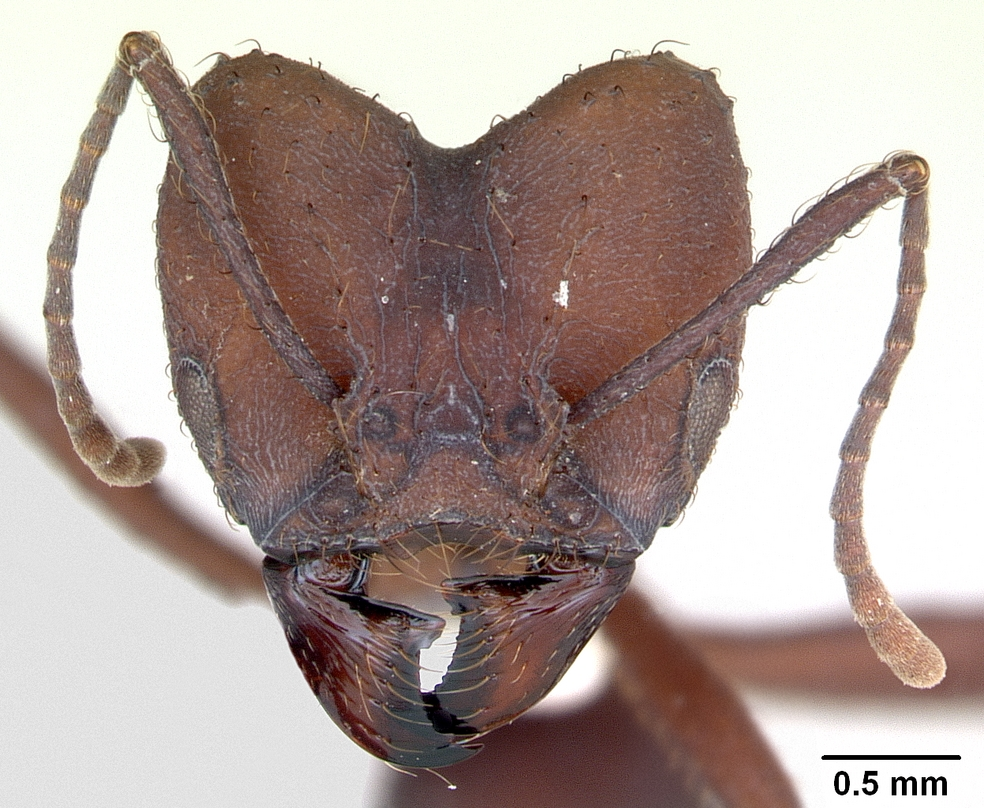
Head view of an A. balzani worker

== See also ==
- List of leafcutter ants
