= Acromyrmex landolti =

Scientific classification
- Kingdom: Animalia
- Phylum: Arthropoda
- Clade: Pancrustacea
- Class: Insecta
- Order: Hymenoptera
- Family: Formicidae
- Subfamily: Myrmicinae
- Genus: Acromyrmex
- Species: A. landolti

Binomial name
- Acromyrmex landolti Forel, 1885

Species of ant

Acromyrmex landolti is a species of leaf-cutter ant, a New World ant of the subfamily Myrmicinae of the genus Acromyrmex. This species is from one of the two genera of advanced attines (fungus-growing ants) within the tribe Attini.

== Subspecies ==
- Acromyrmex landolti myersi

== See also ==
- List of leafcutter ants
