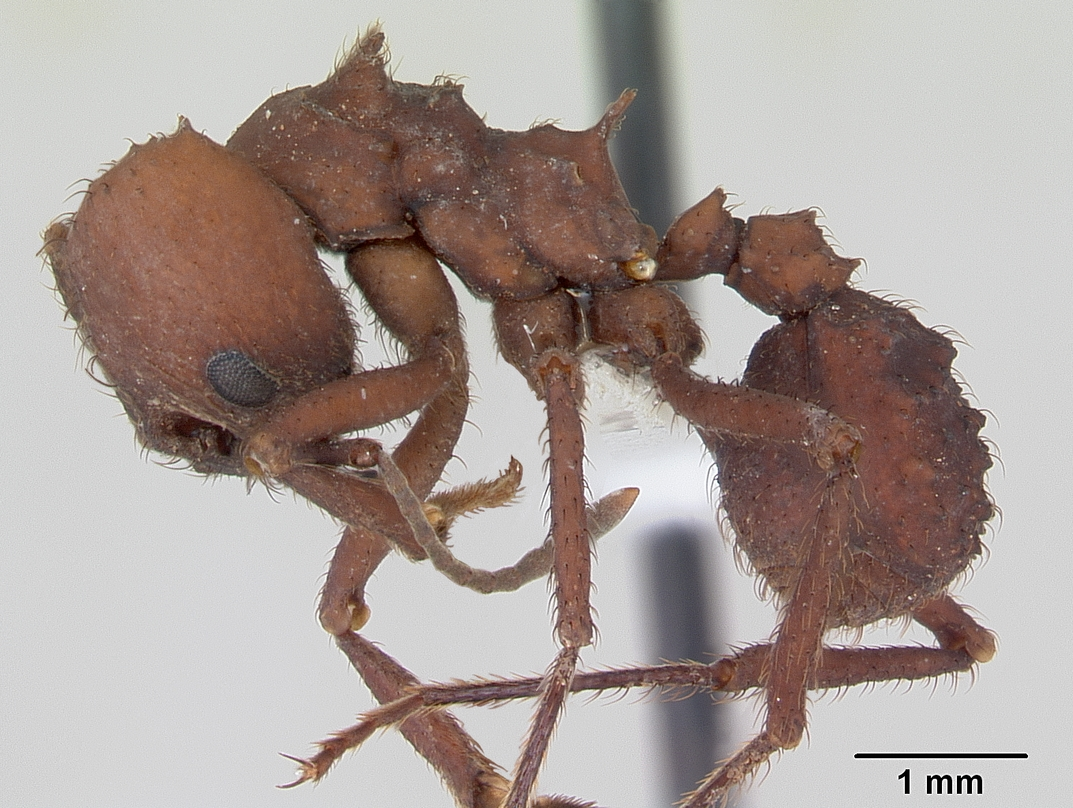
- Profile view of ant Acromyrmex fracticornis specimen.

Scientific classification
- Kingdom: Animalia
- Phylum: Arthropoda
- Clade: Pancrustacea
- Class: Insecta
- Order: Hymenoptera
- Family: Formicidae
- Subfamily: Myrmicinae
- Genus: Acromyrmex
- Species: A. fracticornis

Binomial name
- Acromyrmex fracticornis Forel, 1909

= Acromyrmex fracticornis =

Species of ant

Acromyrmex fracticornis is a species of leaf-cutter ant, a New World ant of the subfamily Myrmicinae of the genus Acromyrmex. This species is from one of the two genera of advanced attines (fungus-growing ants) within the tribe Attini. It is found in the wild naturally in southern Brazil, Paraguay and northern Argentina.

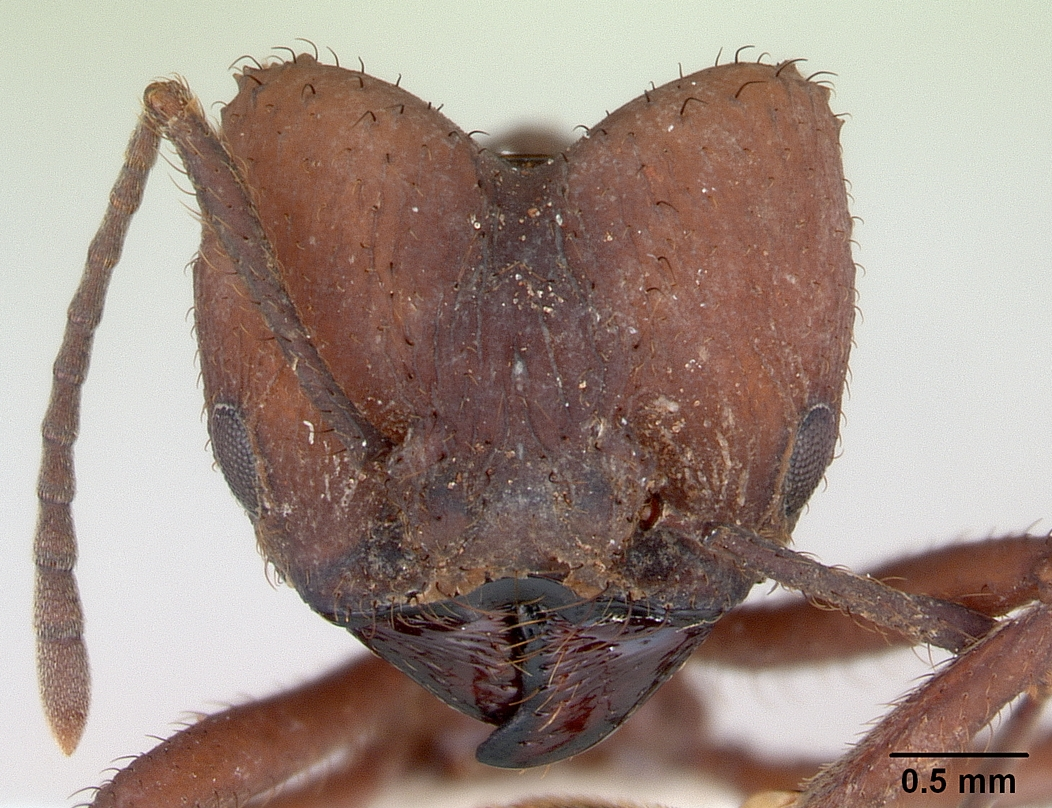
Head view of ant Acromyrmex fracticornis specimen.

Acromyrmex fracticornis colony densities are positively correlated with basal grass coverage and the amount of grazing damage. A. fracticornis preferentially harvested tender grass blades that showed little or no previous damage by other invertebrates. They preferentially harvest Digitaria smutsii and Panicum maximum more often than other species, and Pennisetum purpureum, Pennisetum ciliare and Brachiaria decumbens were selected significantly less often.

== Synonyms ==
- Acromyrmex jorgenseni Gonçalves, 1961
- Moellerius fracticornis Forel, 1909

== See also ==
- List of leafcutter ants
