= Acromyrmex diasi =

Scientific classification
- Kingdom: Animalia
- Phylum: Arthropoda
- Clade: Pancrustacea
- Class: Insecta
- Order: Hymenoptera
- Family: Formicidae
- Subfamily: Myrmicinae
- Genus: Acromyrmex
- Species: A. diasi

Binomial name
- Acromyrmex diasi Gonçalves, 1983

Species of ant

Acromyrmex diasi is a species of leaf-cutter ant, a New World ant of the subfamily Myrmicinae of the genus Acromyrmex. It is found in the wild naturally in Brazil.

== See also ==
- List of leafcutter ants
