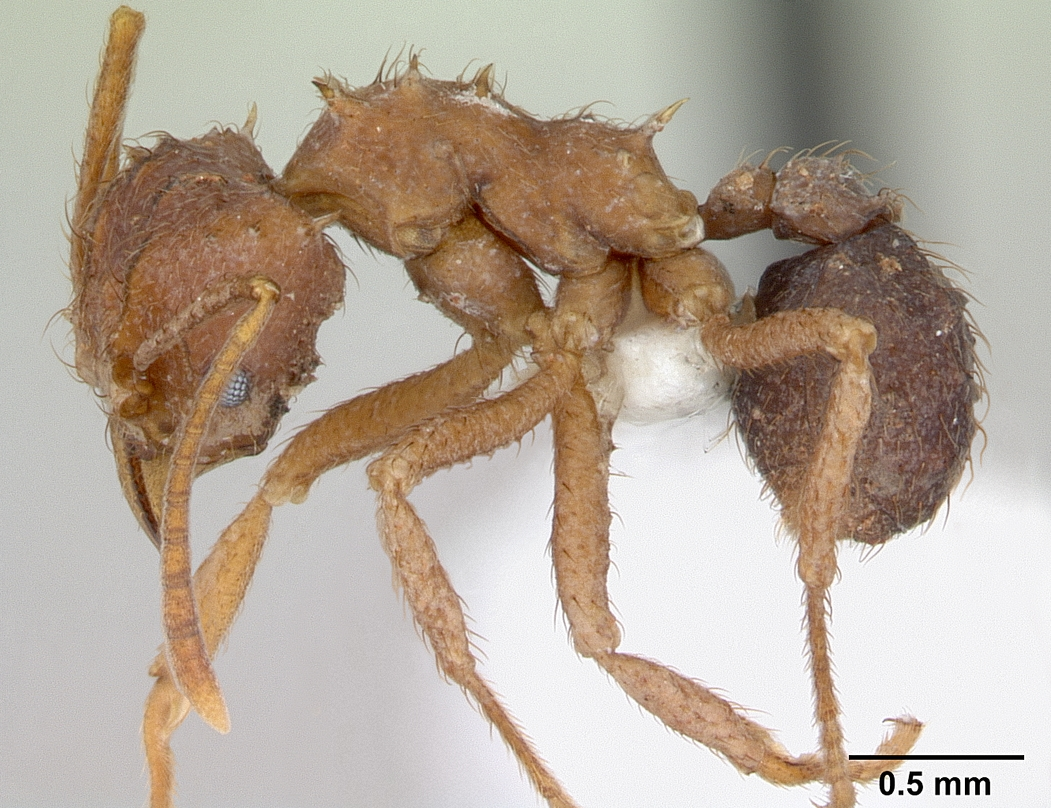

Scientific classification
- Kingdom: Animalia
- Phylum: Arthropoda
- Clade: Pancrustacea
- Class: Insecta
- Order: Hymenoptera
- Family: Formicidae
- Subfamily: Myrmicinae
- Genus: Acromyrmex
- Species: A. coronatus

Binomial name
- Acromyrmex coronatus Fabricius, 1804

Synonyms
- A. flavescens Gonçalves, 1961; A. medianus Gonçalves, 1961; A. meinerti Gonçalves, 1961; A. modesta Gonçalves, 1961; A. moelleri Gonçalves, 1961; A. obscurior Gonçalves, 1961; A. ochraceolus Gonçalves, 1961; A. ornatus Gonçalves, 1961; Formica coronata Fabricius, 1804

= Acromyrmex coronatus =

Species of ant

Acromyrmex coronatus is a New World ant of the subfamily Myrmicinae found in the wild naturally from Guatemala to Brazil and Ecuador.

Acromyrmex coronatus can be identified by the presence of median pronotal spines being usually present and distinct, occasionally reduced or absent, the head tapering behind eyes, and head width of less than or equal to 1.7 mm.

This montane species is tolerant of cold, wet conditions, and colonies can be found in small clearings and gaps in dense cloud forest. For example, on the north side of Volcan Barva, it has been found at 1100 m elevation, but not at 500 or 2000 m. On the Central Valley side, it has been collected at 1600 m at Zurqui. In the Monteverde area, it occurs in the community area, up to the highest ridges at 1700 m, and down to 800 m in the Penas Blancas Valley.

In Monteverde, it is the main pest in gardens, and enters houses at night to cut bread, cabbage, or fruit that has been left out. The nests are often in or under a piece of dead wood, and often with a superstructure of loose, dead leaf fragments. They do not excavate soil very extensively, if at all. They may be arboreal at times, nesting in low branch junctions of epiphyte-laden trees.

Acromyrmex coronatus foraging is continuous at night, but diurnal foraging only occurs after recent rain. Following a heavy rain, diurnal foraging commences, followed by a gradual cessation over a period of a day or two. Periodic rains during the dry season initiate a short bout of diurnal foraging, but when the rains became more continuous, diurnal foraging becomes continuous. Thus, the lack of diurnal foraging during the dry season is a short-term response to immediate environmental conditions and not a long-term change in colony foraging behavior.

Nuptial flights are common in Monteverde, and the distinctively patterned dealate queens are often seen on the roads. Dealate queens have been observed out cutting leaves, suggesting the queens need to forage themselves to establish a colony.

== Subspecies ==
- Acromyrmex coronatus andicola
- Acromyrmex coronatus globoculis
- Acromyrmex coronatus importunus
- Acromyrmex coronatus panamensis
- Acromyrmex coronatus rectispinus

== See also ==
- List of leafcutter ants
