= Acromyrmex ameliae =

Scientific classification
- Kingdom: Animalia
- Phylum: Arthropoda
- Clade: Pancrustacea
- Class: Insecta
- Order: Hymenoptera
- Family: Formicidae
- Subfamily: Myrmicinae
- Genus: Acromyrmex
- Species: A. ameliae

Binomial name
- Acromyrmex ameliae De Souza, Soares & Della Lucia, 2007

Species of ant

Acromyrmex ameliae is a species of New World ants of the subfamily Myrmicinae. This species is from one of the two genera of advanced fungus-growing ants within the tribe Attini. It is found in the wild naturally in South America in Minas Gerais, Brazil.

Acromyrmex ameliae is a social parasite with much smaller reproductives (females and males) than those of its hosts A. subterraneus subterraneus and A. s. brunneus . Morphometrically, the A. ameliae queen is not a simple miniature of its hosts' queens, like Myrmica microrubra and its host Myrmica rubra. The species can be distinguish from the host using its propodeal spines: they are straight and laterally compressed unlike A. subterraneus subspecies, where they are slight to strongly curved and conical. A. ameliae differs from Acromyrmex insinuator (another social parasite) not only by its size and color (brown dark against yellowish-orange), but also it does not present a single strong median ruga extending from the central ocellus to the level of the posterior borders of lateral ocelli, like A. insinuator. On the contrary, around its central ocellus, the cuticle is wholly rugous without a distinct median ruga. In A. insinuator, the anteroventral edge of the postpetiole is broadly and evenly concave, without a broad median anteroventral extension. The anteroventral portion of the postpetiole in A. ameliae has irregular extensions, without the concavity present in the first species.

As in A. insinuator, reproductives of A. ameliae very much resemble the host species, although with a pronounced reduction in body size. From observations of nuptial flights that occurred in the laboratory, a mating flight is suspected to occur in the wild, but are yet to observed. Alate parasites are found in two different seasons (April and October), unlike the host species, which has only a single synchronized nuptial flight per year in November and December. More than one nuptial flight each year could increase the likelihood of successful invasion of new colonies by A. ameliae. The well-defined nuptial flight of the hosts is normally observed in November and December so that newly fertilized parasite A. ameliae queens (produced in April) can colonize established colonies of A. s. subterraneus and A. s. brunneus well before they reproduce themselves.

Like A. insinuator, A. ameliae is one of the rare inquiline parasites that produces workers and resembles its host in morphology, but unlike A. insinuator, A. ameliae queens differ dramatically from their host queen in size. In all colonies of A. subterraneus sampled in A. ameliae range, all of them were parasitized by A. ameliae. Thus, A. ameliae appears to be very common, yet until recently has been overlooked, suggesting the possibility that many other species of social parasites exist that have yet to be identified.

As in A. insinuator, A. ameliae produces a workforce that is essential for the production of the parasite alates, but this trait is being selected against over evolutionary time, although it has not yet been lost.

== See also ==
- List of leafcutter ants
