= Acromyrmex aspersus =

Scientific classification
- Domain: Eukaryota
- Kingdom: Animalia
- Phylum: Arthropoda
- Class: Insecta
- Order: Hymenoptera
- Family: Formicidae
- Subfamily: Myrmicinae
- Genus: Acromyrmex
- Species: A. aspersus

Binomial name
- Acromyrmex aspersus F. Smith, 1858

Synonyms
- Acromyrmex affinis Goncalves, 1961; Acromyrmex clarus Goncalves, 1961; Acromyrmex inquirens Goncalves, 1961; Acromyrmex mesonotalis Goncalves, 1961; Oecodoma aspersa F. Smith, 1858

Species of ant

Acromyrmex aspersus is a species of New World ant of the subfamily Myrmicinae found in the wild naturally in southern Brazil and Peru. Commonly known as "leaf-cutter ants", they are a species of ant from one of the two genera of advanced fungus-growing ants within the tribe Attini.

== Subspecies ==
Acromyrmex aspersus contains these subspecies:

- Acromyrmex aspersus aspersus F. Smith, 1858
- Acromyrmex aspersus fuhrmanni Forel, 1914
