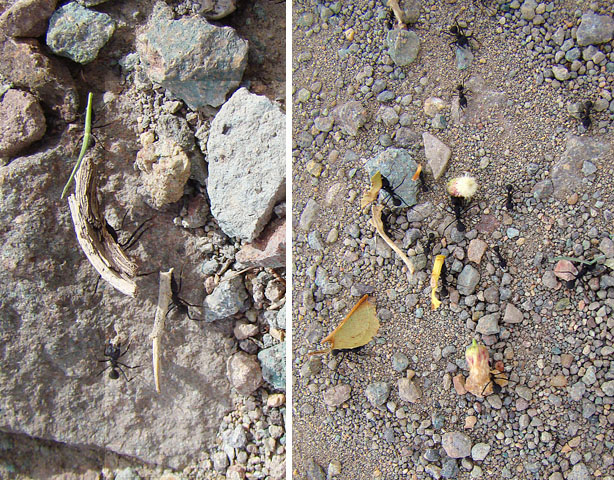

Scientific classification
- Kingdom: Animalia
- Phylum: Arthropoda
- Clade: Pancrustacea
- Class: Insecta
- Order: Hymenoptera
- Family: Formicidae
- Subfamily: Myrmicinae
- Genus: Acromyrmex
- Species: A. lobicornis

Binomial name
- Acromyrmex lobicornis Emery, 1888

= Acromyrmex lobicornis =

Species of ant

Acromyrmex lobicornis is a species of leaf-cutter ant, a New World ant of the subfamily Myrmicinae of the genus Acromyrmex. This species is from one of the two genera of advanced attines (fungus-growing ants) within the tribe Attini.

== Subspecies ==
- Acromyrmex lobicornis cochlearis
- Acromyrmex lobicornis ferrugineus
- Acromyrmex lobicornis pencosensis
- Acromyrmex lobicornis pruinosior

== Habitat ==
Acromyrmex lobicornis thrives in disturbed habitats, likely due to higher concentrations of pioneer plant species. Pioneer plants have lower levels of secondary metabolites and higher nutrient concentrations than the shade-tolerant species that will come later.

== See also ==
- List of leafcutter ants
