= Acromyrmex ambiguus =

Scientific classification
- Domain: Eukaryota
- Kingdom: Animalia
- Phylum: Arthropoda
- Class: Insecta
- Order: Hymenoptera
- Family: Formicidae
- Subfamily: Myrmicinae
- Genus: Acromyrmex
- Species: A. ambiguus

Binomial name
- Acromyrmex ambiguus Emery, 1888

Synonyms
- Acromyrmex erectus Goncalves, 1961

Species of ant

Acromyrmex ambiguus is a species of New World ants of the subfamily Myrmicinae found in the wild naturally in southern Brazil, Paraguay and Uruguay. Commonly known as "leaf-cutter ants", they are a species of ant from one of the two genera of advanced fungus-growing ants within the tribe Attini.
