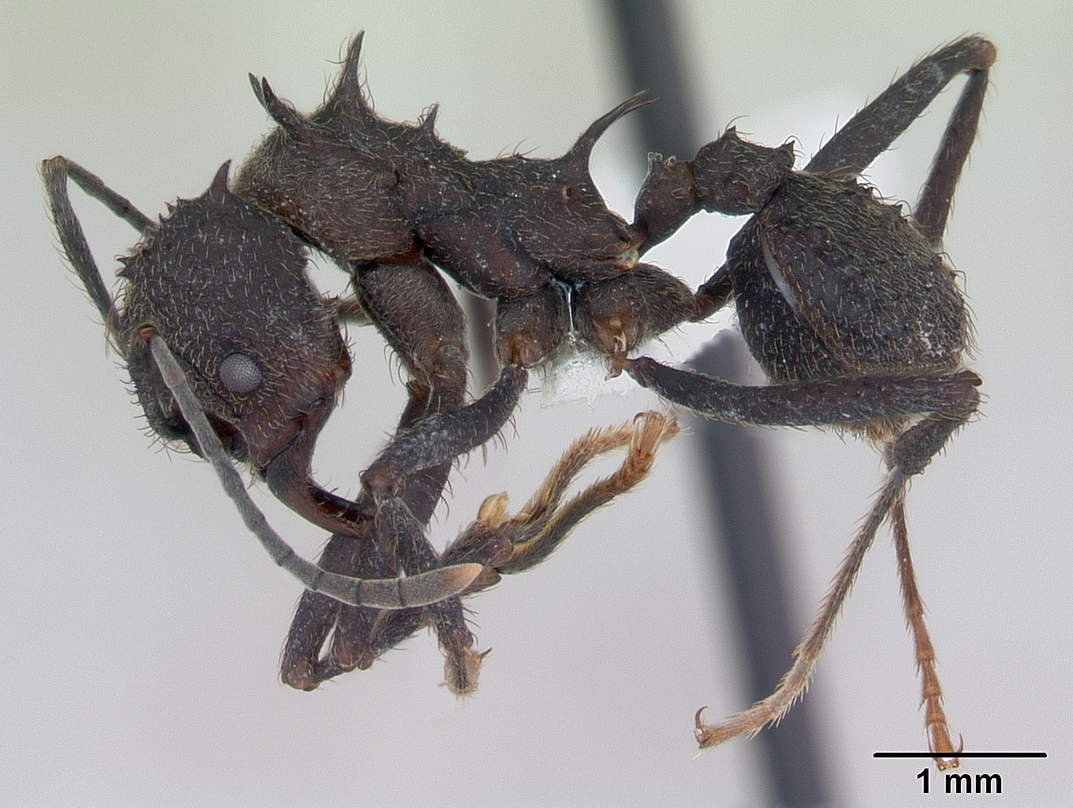

Scientific classification
- Kingdom: Animalia
- Phylum: Arthropoda
- Clade: Pancrustacea
- Class: Insecta
- Order: Hymenoptera
- Family: Formicidae
- Subfamily: Myrmicinae
- Genus: Acromyrmex
- Species: A. lundii

Binomial name
- Acromyrmex lundii Guérin-Méneville, 1838

= Acromyrmex lundii =

Species of ant

Acromyrmex lundii is a species of New World ants of the subfamily Myrmicinae of the genus Acromyrmex. It is found in the wild naturally in southern Brazil, Paraguay, Uruguay and northern Argentina.

== Subspecies ==
The species Acromyrmex lundii contains the following subspecies:

- Acromyrmex lundii boliviensis Emery, 1905
- Acromyrmex lundii carli Gonçalves, 1961
- Acromyrmex lundii decolor Emery, 1905
- Acromyrmex lundii lundii Guérin-Méneville, 1838
- Acromyrmex lundii parallelus Santschi, 1916

== Synonyms ==
- Acromyrmex bonariensis Gallardo, 1916
- Acromyrmex dubia Gonçalves, 1961
- Acromyrmex risii Santschi, 1925
- Myrmica lundii Guérin-Méneville, 1838

== See also ==
- List of leafcutter ants
