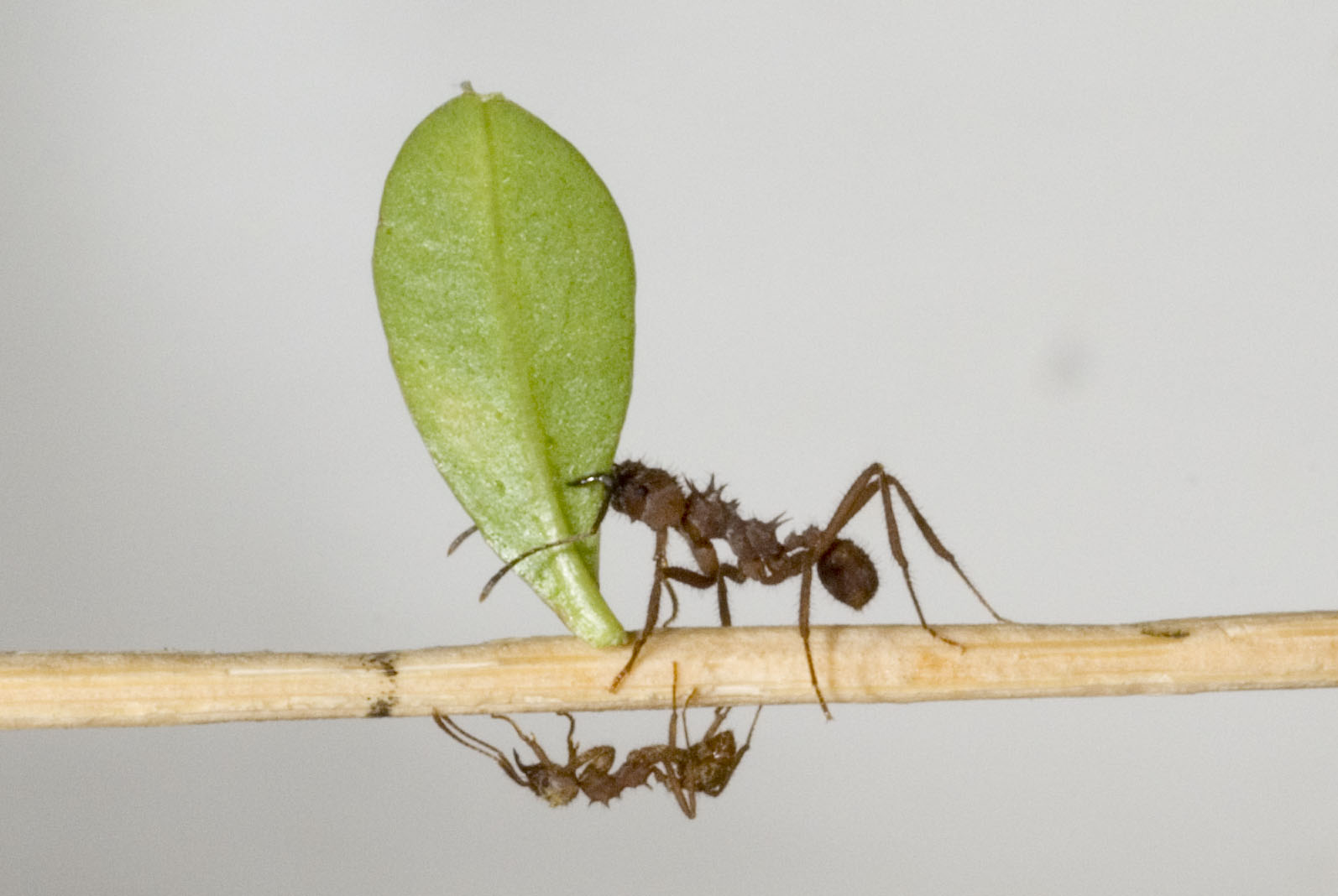
- Worker Acromyrmex octospinosus carrying a leaf

Scientific classification
- Domain: Eukaryota
- Kingdom: Animalia
- Phylum: Arthropoda
- Class: Insecta
- Order: Hymenoptera
- Family: Formicidae
- Subfamily: Myrmicinae
- Genus: Acromyrmex
- Species: A. octospinosus

Binomial name
- Acromyrmex octospinosus (Reich, 1793)

Synonyms
- Acromyrmex guentheri (Forel, 1893); Formica octospinosa Reich, 1793

= Acromyrmex octospinosus =

Species of ant

Acromyrmex octospinosus is a species of New World ants of the subfamily Myrmicinae of the genus Acromyrmex. It is found in the wild naturally in Central America ranging from southern Mexico down to Panama; and across northern South America in Venezuela.

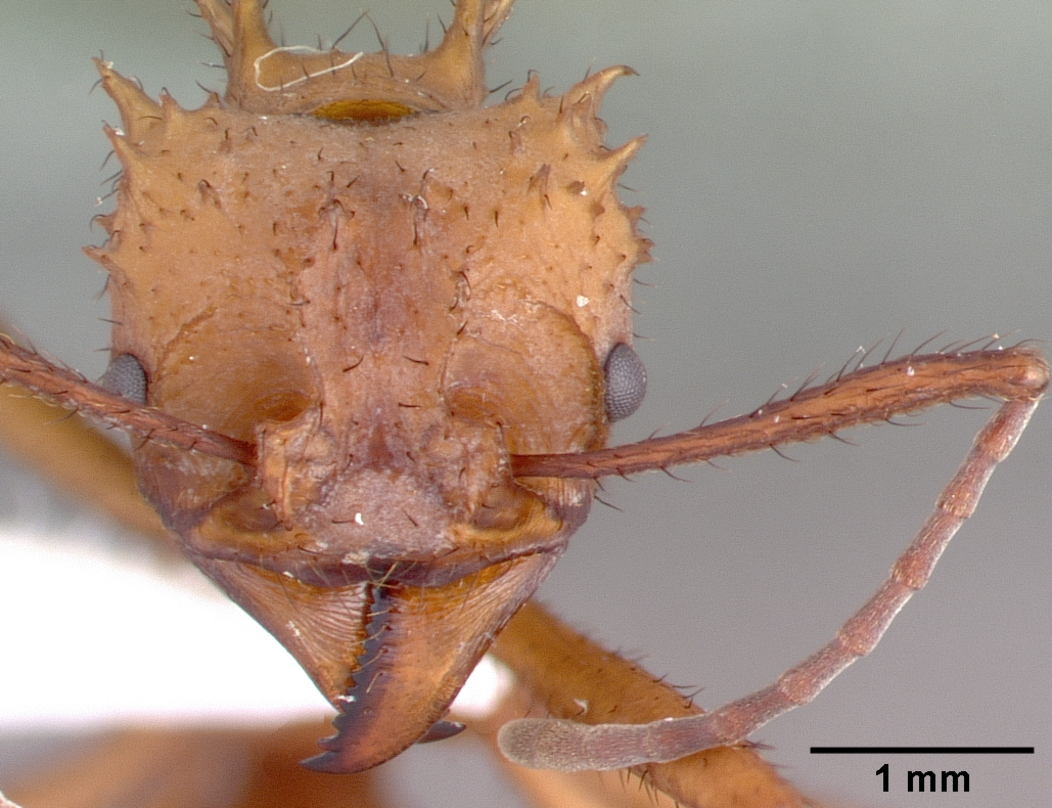
Head view of ant Acromyrmex octospinosus specimen

Foundresses of the leaf-cutting ant Acromyrmex octospinosus forage for leaves as garden substrate (semi-claustral foundation). The fungal pellet and substrate usually are attached to rootlets, which are used as a platform for the garden. This arrangement keeps the garden suspended away from the earthen chamber of the underground nest during early colony growth, and it serves to minimize contact between the garden and contaminants. A. octospinosus foundresses produce from 3 to 7 workers in 2.7 months after founding the nest, but workers do not forage for substrate at this time. Incipient nests died or were abandoned at a monthly rate of about 50%. The ants routinely clean their legs before manipulating the garden substrate. The foundresses use their fore-legs to rub the surface of the metapleural gland, and they then use typical grooming behaviors to pass the forelegs through the mouthparts, after which the ant then licks the garden substrate. Similarly, ants apparently use their mouths to transfer fecal droplets to their legs. These grooming behaviors are prophylactic behaviors that may help the foundress maintain a hygienic garden.

== Subspecies ==
The species contains three subspecies:

- Acromyrmex octospinosus cubanus Wheeler, 1937
- Acromyrmex octospinosus ekchuah Wheeler, 1937
- Acromyrmex octospinosus inti Wheeler, 1937
