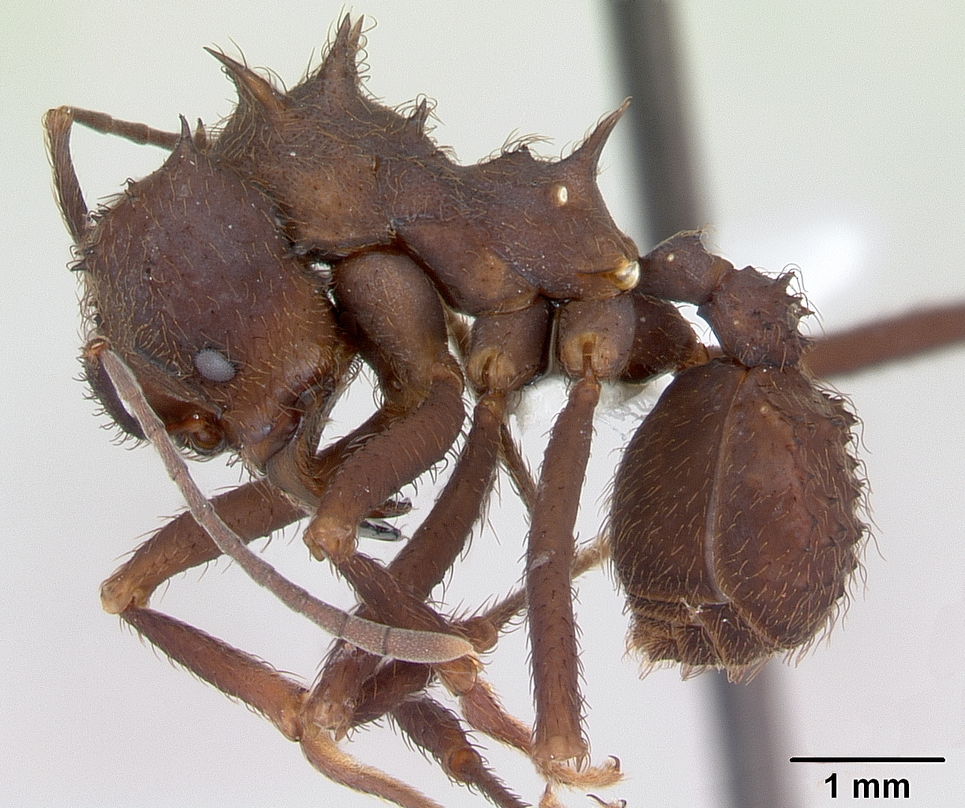

Scientific classification
- Kingdom: Animalia
- Phylum: Arthropoda
- Clade: Pancrustacea
- Class: Insecta
- Order: Hymenoptera
- Family: Formicidae
- Subfamily: Myrmicinae
- Genus: Acromyrmex
- Species: A. niger

Binomial name
- Acromyrmex niger (F. Smith 1858)

Synonyms
- List: Atta nigra (Smith, 1858); Oecodoma nigra Smith, 1858; Acromyrmex muticinoda (Forel, 1901); Atta muticinoda Forel, 1901; Atta nigra muticinoda Forel, 1901; Acromyrmex muticinoda depressoculis Forel, 1913; Acromyrmex subterraneus depressoculis Forel, 1913; Acromyrmex muticinoda homalops (Emery, 1905); Atta coronata homalops Emery, 1905; Atta muticinoda homalops Emery, 1905

= Acromyrmex niger =

Species of ant

Acromyrmex niger is a species of New World ants of the subfamily Myrmicinae of the genus Acromyrmex. It is found in the wild naturally in southern Brazil and Paraguay.
