= Leafcutter ant =

Over 50 species of leaf-foraging ants of the Americas

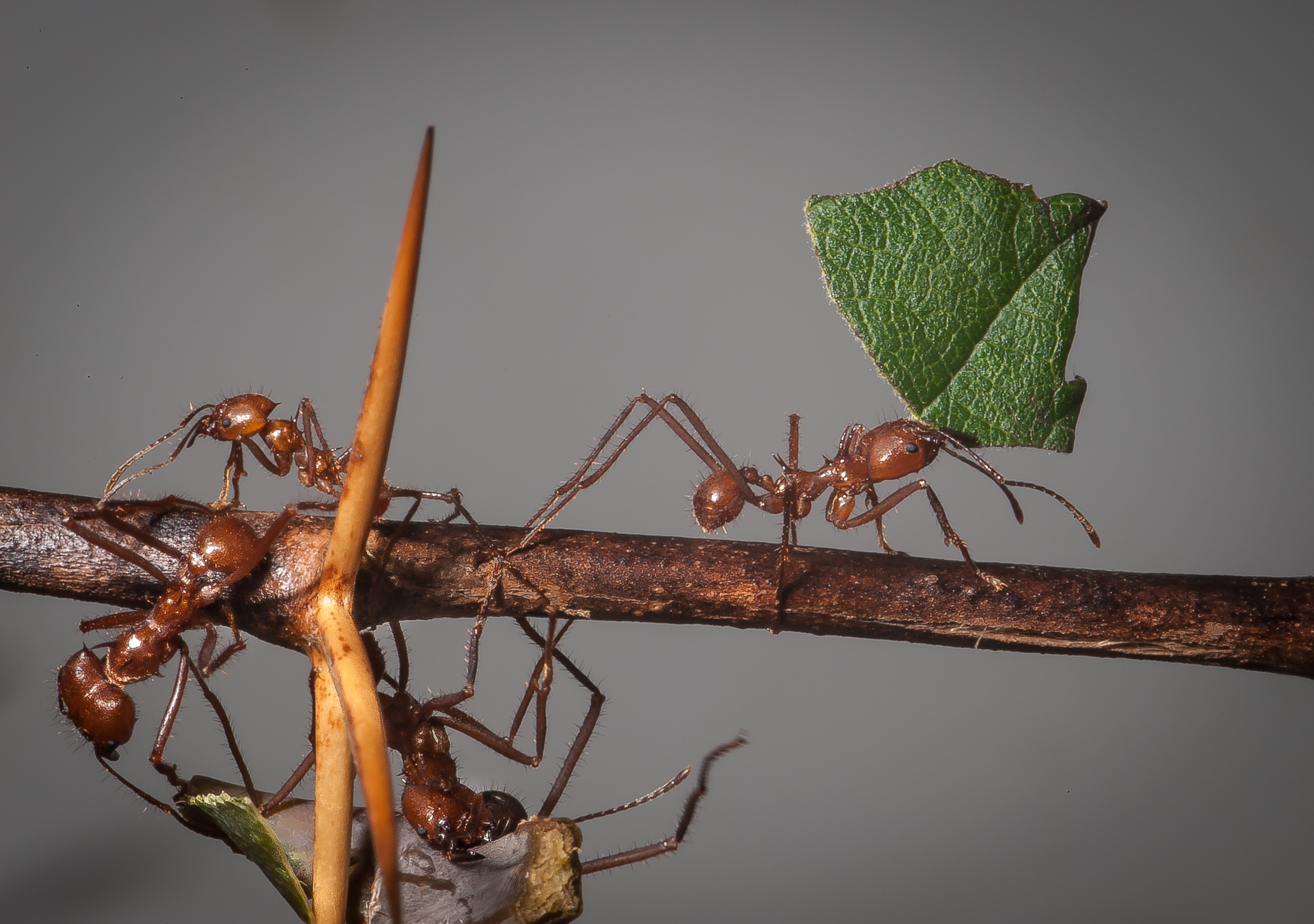
Atta cephalotes, Wilhelma Zoo, Stuttgart

Leafcutter ants are several species of fungus-growing ants that share the behaviour of cutting leaves which they carry back to their nests to farm fungus. Next to humans, leafcutter ants form some of the largest and most complex animal societies on Earth. In a few years, the central mound of their underground nests can grow to more than 30 m (98 ft) across, with smaller radiating mounds extending out to a radius of 80 m (260 ft), taking up 30 to 600 m^{2} (320 to 6,460 sq ft) and occupied by 3.55 million individuals.

== Leafcutting groups ==
Leafcutter ants are any of at least 55 species of leaf-chewing ants belonging to the three genera Atta, Acromyrmex, and Amoimyrmex, within the tribe Attini. These species of tropical, fungus-growing ants are all endemic to South and Central America, Mexico, and parts of the southern United States. Leafcutter ants can carry up to 50 times their body weight and cut and process fresh vegetation (leaves, flowers, and grasses) to serve as the nutritional substrate for their fungal cultivates. The leaf cutter ant species has a bite force of 800 mN, which is 2600 times their body weight, which allows them to cut leaves as well as defend the nest.

Acromyrmex and Atta ants have much in common anatomically; however, the two can be identified by their external differences. Atta ants have three pairs of spines and a smooth exoskeleton on the upper surface of the thorax, while Acromyrmex ants have four pairs and a rough exoskeleton. The exoskeleton itself is covered in a thin layer of mineral coating, composed of rhombohedral crystals that are generated by the ants. Amoimyrmex and Acromyrmex differ in that Amoimyrmex lacks tubercles on the first gastral segment, and recent phylogenetic evidence shows that Amoimyrmex diverged before the other two genera of leafcutter ants.

== Colony lifecycle ==
=== Reproduction and colony founding ===
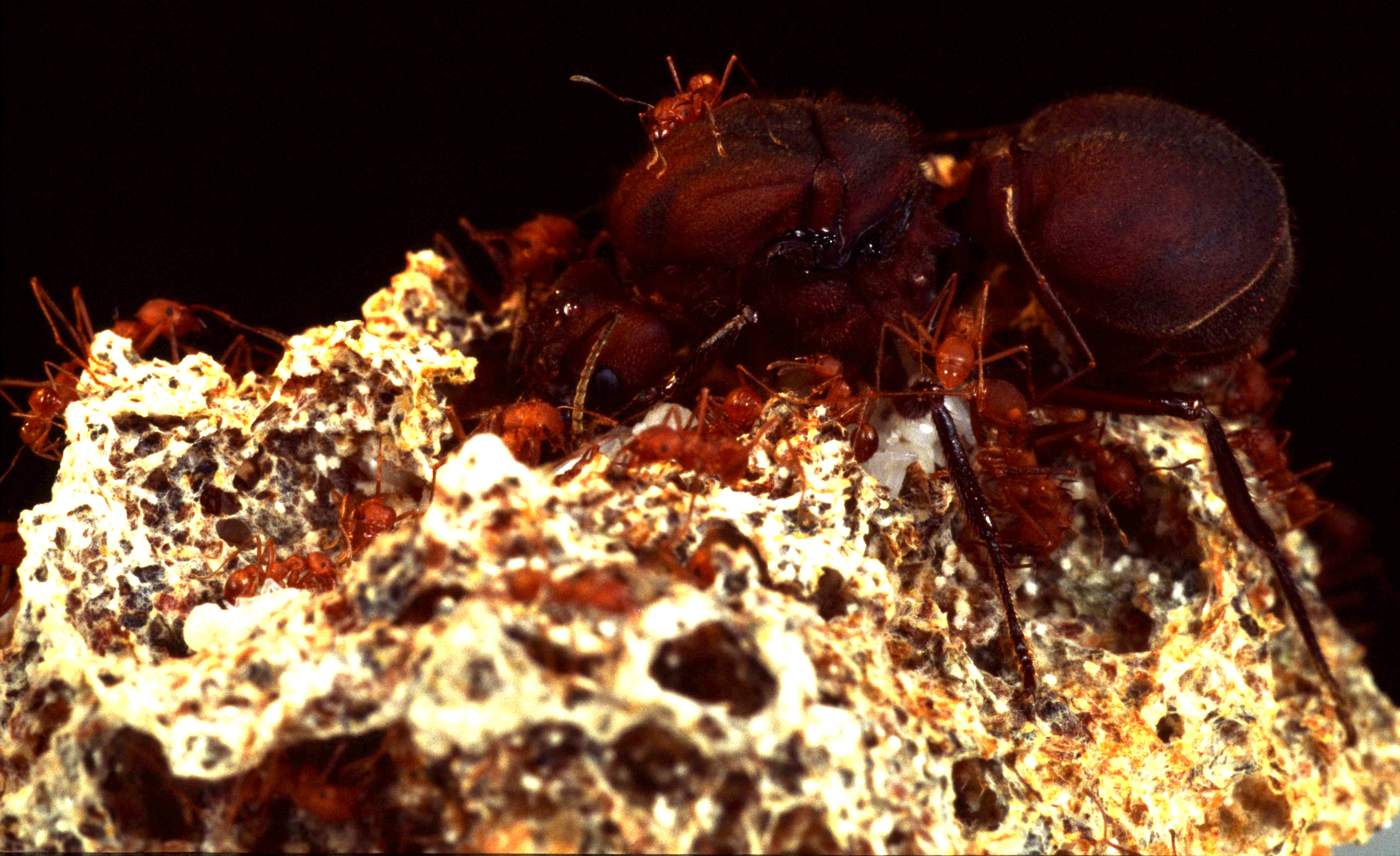
Atta colombica, queen with larvae and workers on substrate

Winged females and males leave their respective nests en masse and engage in a nuptial flight known as the revoada (Portuguese) or vuelo nupcial (Spanish). Each female mates with multiple males to collect the 300 million sperm she needs to set up a colony.

Once on the ground, the female loses her wings and searches for a suitable underground lair in which to found her colony. The success rate of these young queens is very low, and only 2.5% will go on to establish a long-lived colony. To start her own fungus garden, the queen stores bits of the parental fungus garden mycelium in her infrabuccal pocket, which is located within her oral cavity. Colonies are generally founded by individual queens — haplometrosis. Because colonies with multiple queens over the lifespan of the colony have been found by a large number of investigators – by Weber (1937), Jonkman (1977), Huber (1907), Moser & Lewis (1981), Mariconi & Zamith (1963), Moser (1963), and Walter et al. (1938) — it is believable that some colonies have multiple foundresses — termed pleometrosis. Colony founding by pleometrosis has only been confirmed in Atta texana, by Vinson (1985).

=== Colony hierarchy ===
In leafcutter colonies, ants are divided into castes, mostly of different sizes, that perform different functions. Acromyrmex and Atta exhibit a high degree of polymorphism, four castes being present in established colonies — minims, minors, mediae, and majors, also known as soldiers or dinergates. Atta ants are more polymorphic than Acromyrmex, with less difference in size from the smallest to largest types of Acromyrmex.

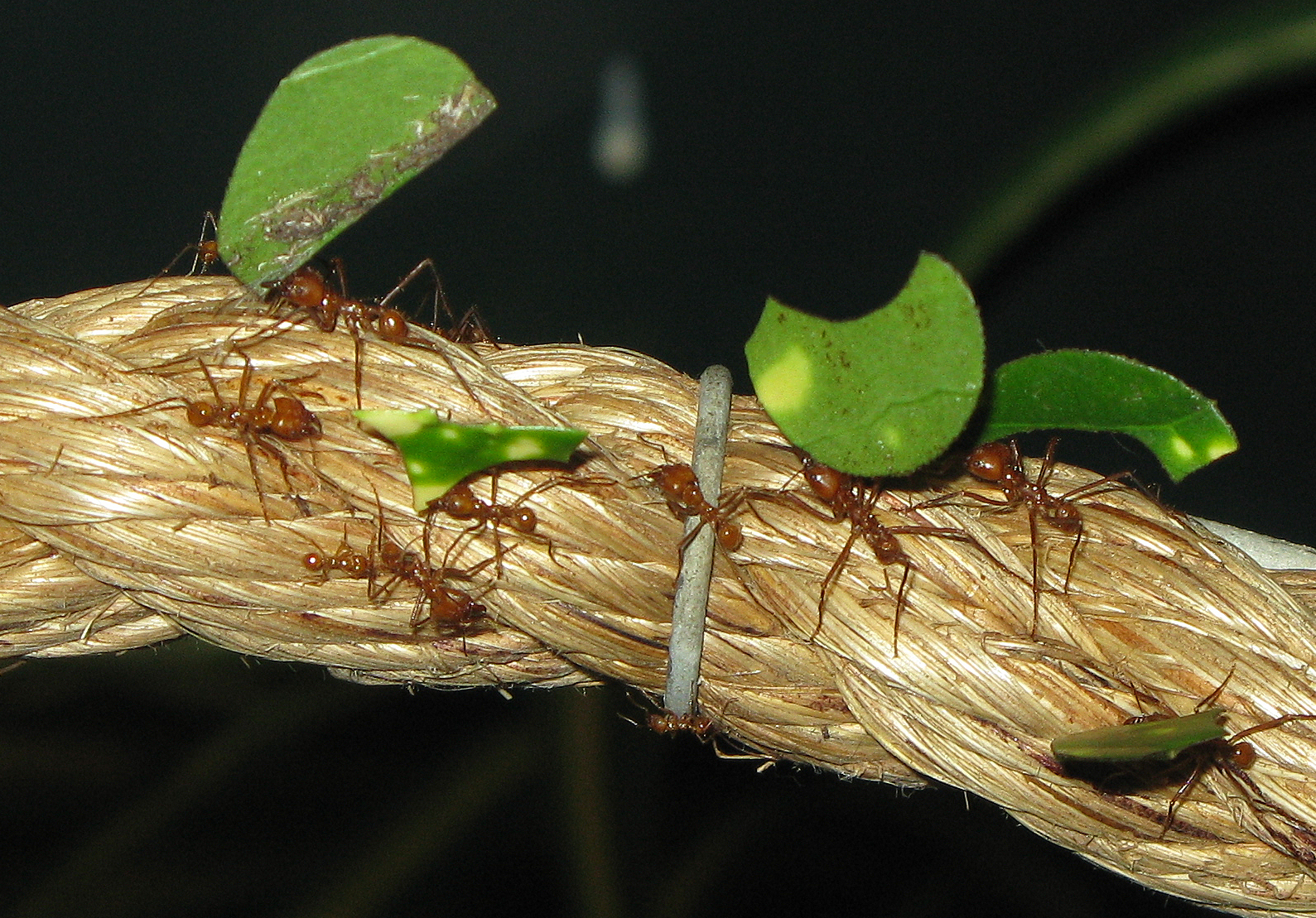
Leafcutter ant Atta cephalotes

- Minims are the smallest and thinnest workers, and tend to the growing brood or care for the fungus gardens. Head width is less than 1 mm.
- Minors are slightly larger than minim workers, and are present in large numbers in and around foraging columns. These ants are the first line of defense and continuously patrol the surrounding terrain and vigorously attack any threats to the foraging lines. Head width is around 1.8–2.2 mm.
- Mediae are the generalized foragers, which cut leaves and bring the leaf fragments back to the nest.
- Majors, the largest worker ants, act as soldiers, defending the nest from intruders, although recent evidence indicates majors also participate in other activities, such as clearing the main foraging trails of large debris and carrying bulky items back to the nest. The largest soldiers (Atta laevigata) may have bodies 16 mm long and heads 7 mm wide.

== Ant–fungus mutualism ==
Their societies are based on an ant–fungus mutualism. The only two other groups of insects to use fungus-based agriculture are ambrosia beetles and termites. Different species of ants use different species of fungus, but all of the fungi the ants use are members of the family Lepiotaceae. The ants actively cultivate their fungus, feeding it with freshly cut plant material and keeping it free from pests and molds. This mutualistic relationship is further augmented by another symbiotic partner, a bacterium that grows on the ants and secretes chemicals; essentially, the ants use portable antimicrobials. Leaf cutter ants are sensitive enough to adapt to the fungi's reaction to different plant material, apparently detecting chemical signals from the fungus: if a particular type of leaf is toxic to the fungus, the colony will no longer collect it. The fungus cultivated by the adults is used to feed the ant larvae, and the adult ants feed on leaf sap. The fungus needs the ants and the larvae need the fungus; mutualism is obligatory.

The fungi used by the higher attine ants no longer produce spores. These ants fully domesticated their fungal partner 15 million years ago, a process that took 30 million years to complete. Their fungi produce nutritious and swollen hyphal tips (gongylidia) that grow in bundles called staphylae, which have no other function than to feed the ants. Leucoagaricus gongylophorus is the most commonly documented fungi farmed by higher attine ant species.

== Behaviour ==
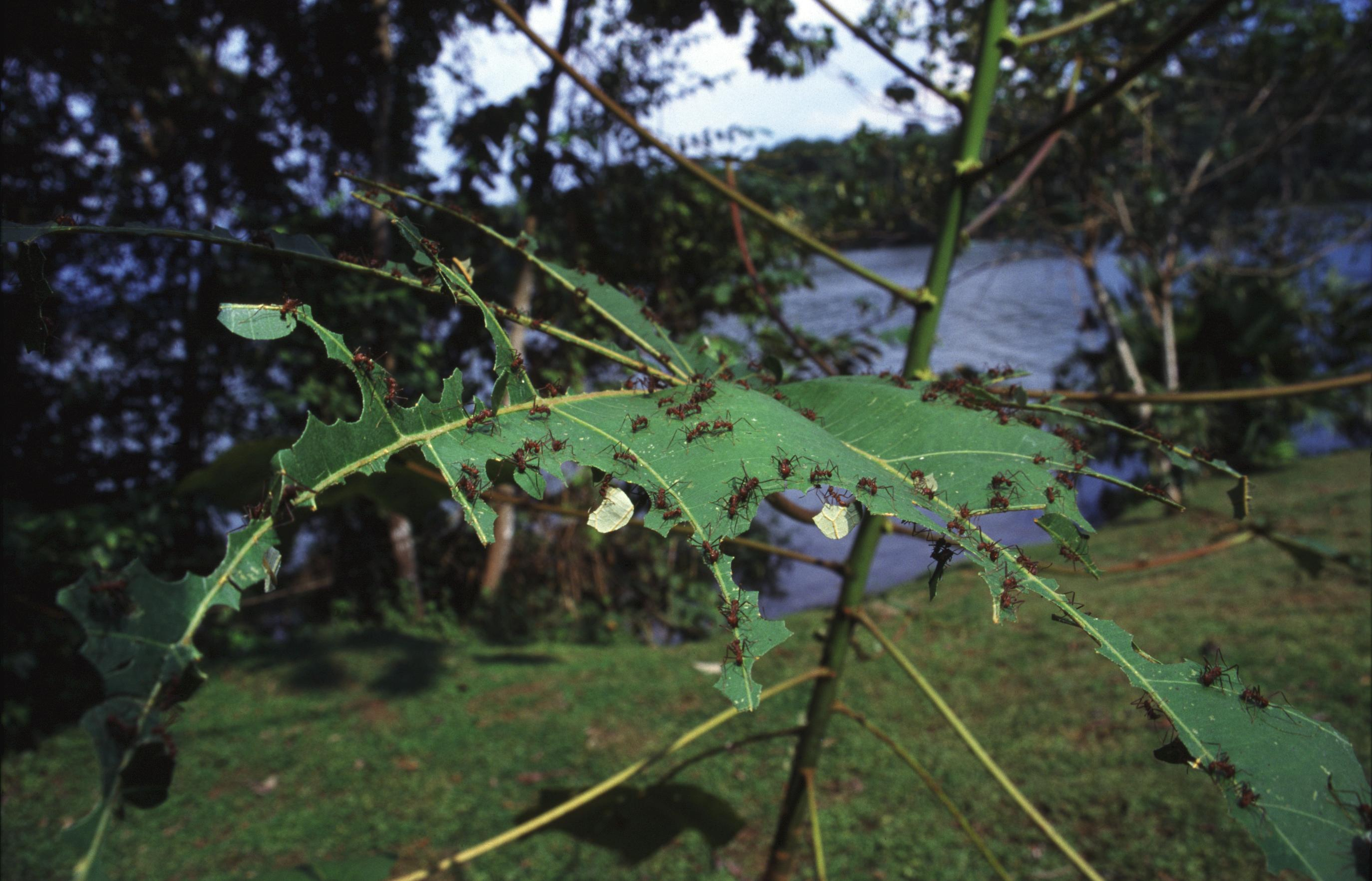
Workers of Atta colombica at work

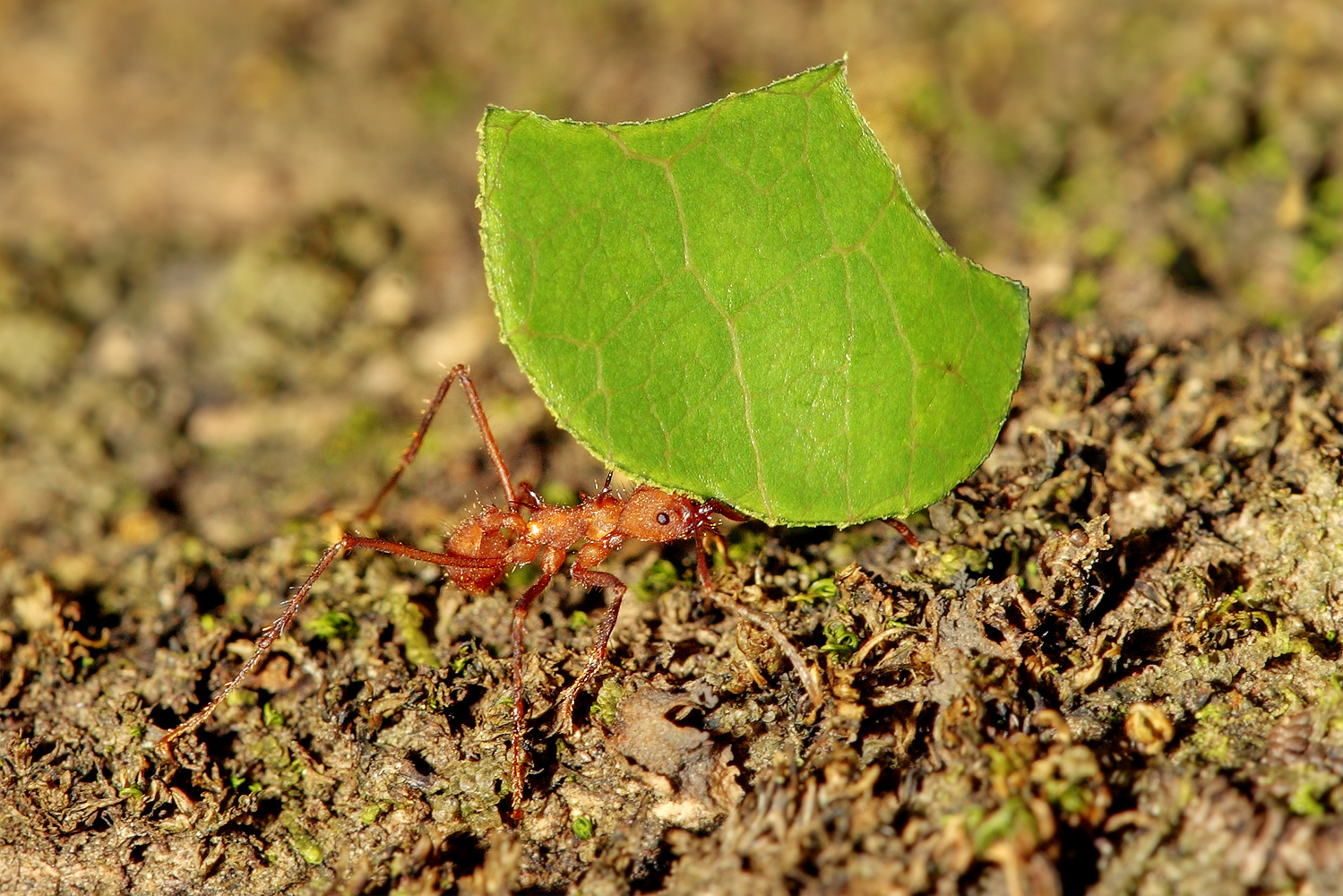
Leafcutter ant in Costa Rica

Leafcutter ants have very specific roles in taking care of the fungal garden and dumping the refuse. Waste management is a key role for each colony's longevity. The necrotrophic parasitic fungus Escovopsis threatens the ants' food source and thus is a constant danger to the ants. The waste transporters and waste-heap workers are the more dispensable leafcutter ants, ensuring the more precious ants can work. The Atta colombica species, unusually for the Attine tribe, have an external waste heap. Waste transporters take the waste, which consists of used substrate and discarded fungus, to the waste heap. Once dropped off at the refuse dump, the heap workers organise the waste and constantly shuffle it around to aid decomposition. A. colombica have been observed placing dead ants around the perimeter of the waste heap.

In addition to feeding the fungal garden with foraged food, mainly consisting of leaves, it is protected from Escovopsis by the antibiotic secretions of Actinomycetota (genus Pseudonocardia). This mutualistic micro-organism lives in the metapleural glands of the ant. Most of the antimicrobials known today were originally isolated from actinomycetes, especially from the genus Streptomyces.

Leafcutter ants use chemical communication and stridulation (substrate-borne vibrations) to communicate with each other.

Leafcutter ants prefer disturbed habitats, likely due to higher concentrations of pioneer plant species. These are more attractive food sources because pioneer plants have lower levels of secondary metabolites and higher nutrient concentrations than the shade-tolerant species that will come later.

== Parasites ==
When the ants are out collecting leaves, they are at risk of attack by some species of phorid flies, parasitoids that lay eggs in the crevices of the worker ants' heads. Often, a minim will stand on a worker ant's leaf and ward off any attack.

Also, the wrong type of fungus can grow during cultivation. Escovopsis, a highly virulent fungus, has the potential to devastate an ant garden, as it is horizontally transmitted. Escovopsis was cultured, during colony foundation, in 6.6% of colonies. However, in one- to two-year-old colonies, almost 60% had Escovopsis growing in the fungal garden.

Nevertheless, leafcutter ants have many adaptive mechanisms to recognize and control infections by Escovopsis and other micro-organisms. The most common known behaviors rely on workers reducing the number of fungal spores by grooming, or removing an infected piece of the fungus garden and throwing it away at the waste dump (described as weeding).

== Interactions with humans ==
In some parts of their range, leafcutter ants can be a serious agricultural pest, defoliating crops and damaging roads and farmland with their nest-making activities. For example, some Atta species are capable of defoliating an entire citrus tree in less than 24 hours. A promising approach to deterring attacks of the leafcutter ant Acromyrmex lobicornis on crops has been demonstrated. Collecting the refuse from the nest and placing it over seedlings or around crops resulted in a deterrent effect over a period of 30 days.

== See also ==
- List of leafcutter ants
- Atta sexdens
- Lepiotaceae
