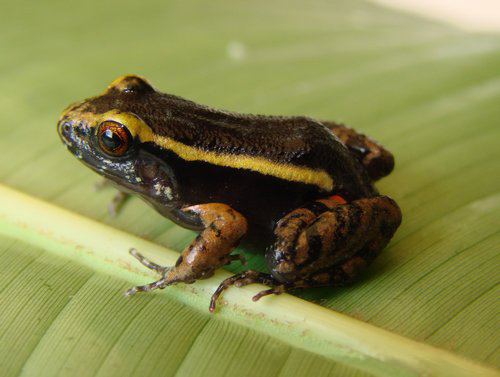

Conservation status
- Least Concern (IUCN 3.1)

Scientific classification
- Kingdom: Animalia
- Phylum: Chordata
- Class: Amphibia
- Order: Anura
- Family: Leptodactylidae
- Subfamily: Leptodactylinae
- Genus: Lithodytes; Fitzinger, 1843
- Species: L. lineatus

Binomial name
- Lithodytes lineatus (Schneider, 1799)

Synonyms
- Rana lineata Schneider, 1799; Rana castanea Shaw, 1802; Bufo albonotatus Daudin, 1803; Rana schneideri Merrem, 1820; Hylodes lineatus Duméril and Bibron, 1841; Hylodes (Lithodytes) lineatus (Schneider, 1799); Eleutherodactylus lineatus (Schneider, 1799); Leptodactylus lineatus (Schneider, 1799); Leptodactylus hemidactyloides Andersson, 1945

= Lithodytes =

Genus of amphibians

Lithodytes is a genus of frogs in the family of Leptodactylidae. It is monotypic, being represented by the single species, Lithodytes lineatus, also commonly known as the gold-striped frog or painted antnest frog. It is found in tropical South America where it lives in humid forests among the leaf litter. These frogs build foam nests at the edge of temporary pools, and the tadpoles develop within these. The frogs also associate with certain leafcutter ants (Atta cephalotes) and breed inside their nests without being attacked by the ants.

== Description ==
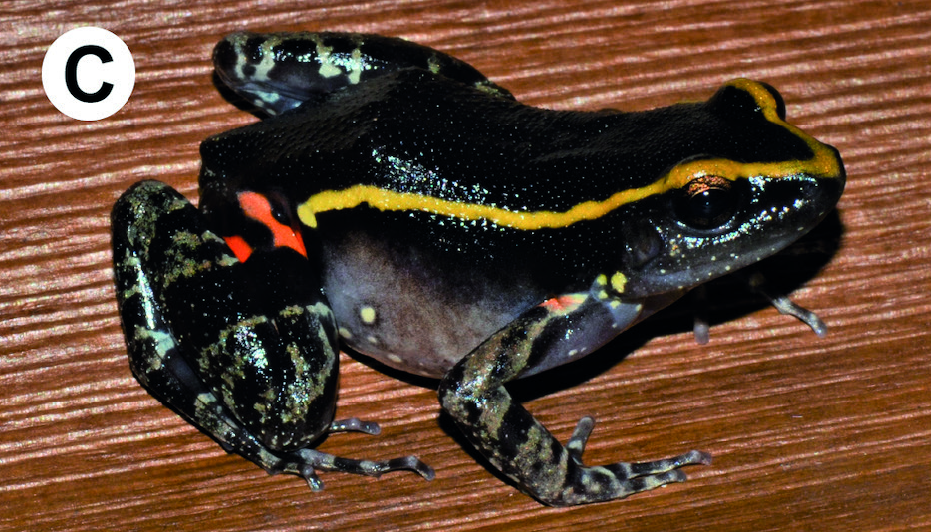
Amapá, Brazil

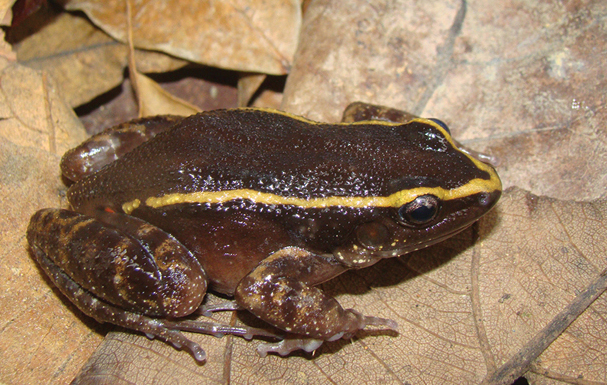
Maranhão, Brazil

The female Lithodytes lineatus grows to a length ranging from 38 and 52 mm (1.5 and 2.0 in), and the male is slightly smaller. It has a slender body and blunt snout. The overall color is black apart from a pair of yellow lateral stripes running from the snout to the groin, where there is a red or orange patch. The limbs are brown banded with black.

This frog is similar in appearance to the brilliant-thighed poison frog (Allobates femoralis), Ameerega hahneli, and the Amazonian poison-dart frog Ameerega picta. By mimicking the appearance of the toxic species, Lithodytes lineatus avoids detection by predators.

=== Tadpoles ===
Tadpoles of this species are bright pink in color, with the color intensity dimming near the tail. They possess translucent pink fins and dark eyes. A distinct white stripe runs down the middle of the back. Tadpoles remain in compact clusters when swimming. The distal half of the tail moves up and down rapidly to propel the tadpole forward. The presence of keratin jaws is inconsistent, and the anatomy of tooth rows also varies considerably.

== Distribution and habitat ==
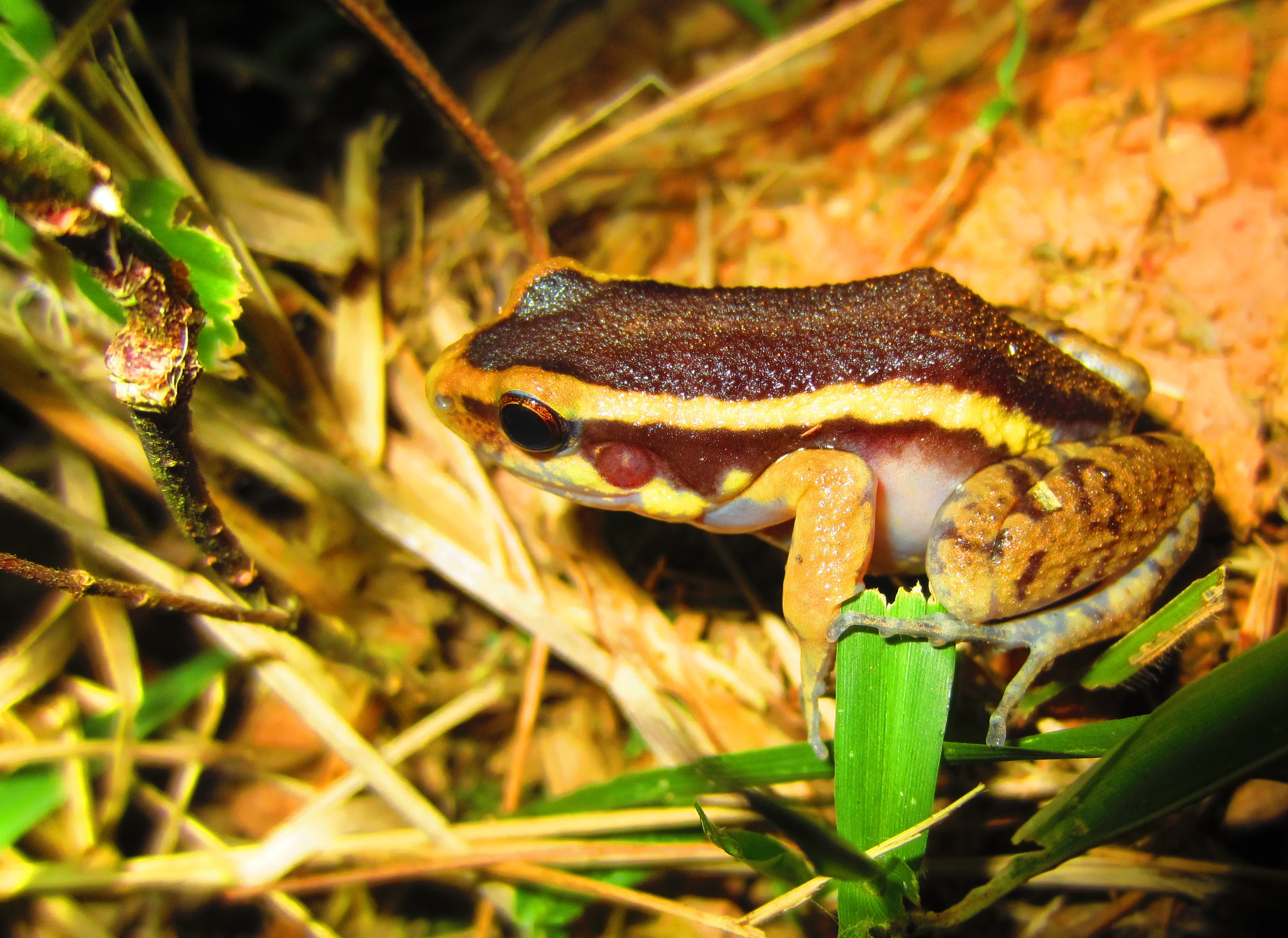
Sucumbíos Province, Ecuador

Lithodytes lineatus is native to tropical South America. Its range includes the Orinoco basin and the Amazon basin and it presents in Colombia, Venezuela, the Guianas, Ecuador, Peru, Bolivia and Brazil, reaches as far as the state of Tocantins.

Its natural habitats are subtropical or tropical moist lowland forests, moist savanna, and intermittent freshwater marshes from altitudes ranging from sea level to 1,800 m (5,900 ft) above sea level. The species can be found below logs, among leaf-litter and in other concealed locations on the forest floor.

== Conservation ==
This common species of frog has a very wide distribution and is estimated to have a large total population. Its population may be in slight decline because of habitat degradation, but the frog seems to be able to adapt to secondary habitats. It is also present in a number of protected areas, so the International Union for Conservation of Nature (IUCN) has rated its conservation status as being of "least concern".

== Phylogeny ==
=== Close relatives ===
The genus Lithodytes is one of three subfamilies under the family Leptodactylidae, the two other subfamilies being Leiuperinae and Paratelmatobiinae. The Leptodactylidae family contains 223 total species as of 2020. Lithodytes are a distinct genus due to differences in larvae, adult morphology, and mitochondria. There are also differentiating factors that distinguish the tadpoles of Lithodytes from other genera of the same family. This includes presence of labial tooth rows, unique papillae, differently shaped choanae, a long muscular tail, terminal oral disc position, and girthier trabeculae carneae.

=== Distinct Features ===
Two distinct sperm types have been observed in Leptodactylidae frogs. Type I sperm has triangle-shaped head and discrete acrosome vesicles, while type II sperm has elongated head and clear acrosome vesicles. Lithodytes lineatus have type II sperm. These sperm types likely evolved independently and are not connected to phylogeny, since some species have been observed to possess both types. It is notable that the lineatus have the longest sperm length of all species in the Leptodactylidae family. Males of this species also have relatively larger testes than others, indicating another distinguishing feature.

== Ecology and Mutualism ==
Lithodytes lineatus breeds in temporary pools, building foam nests in which the female lays 100 to 300 eggs. She then guards the developing eggs until the emerging tadpoles hatch.

This frog is often found in association with the leaf-cutter ant, Atta cephalotes. Male Lithodytes lineatus has been observed calling from the interior of an active ants nest, seemingly unharmed by the ants. The ants usually kill intruders in the nest, however it was found that the frogs captured at the entrance to the nest had a noticeable aromatic odor; researchers hypothesize that it is this odor that signals and prevents attack by the ants. In one instance, four male frogs were calling synchronously from the inside of a large ant nest, the call being a series of brief whistles at the rate of about 85 per minute. Examination of another nest showed various passages and a wide vertical tunnel inside descending to the water table, with foam nests attached to roots in the wall of the tunnel and tadpoles at various stages of development in the underground pool. Ants were also moving along these tunnels.

The frogs benefit from this association in that they have a well-protected breeding site and are safe from predation. The eggs of Lithodytes lineatus require protection from predatory animals such as spiders, beetles, wasps, snakes, and turtles that prey on terrestrial eggs. Additionally, ant nests provide a stable microenvironment of higher humidity than other environments, which is thought to be essential for reproduction and is optimal for frog egg development. It is not clear whether the ants benefit from the arrangement, but an examination of the contents of two frogs' stomachs showed that their diet included earthworms, crickets, isopods and insect larvae, with less than 10% being ants. The consumption of ants may be of benefit to ants and be tolerated by the species as it acts as a form of population control for the ants. Another possibility could be that these frogs are consuming competitors, enemies, and predatory insects of Atta cephalotes, thus decreasing competition and potentially benefiting the ants. Atta ants mainly feed on fungal symbionts growing within their nests and do not require other prey, so consumption of frog eggs in this inter-genus association is not a concern.

Male frogs of this species have been observed calling at the entrance to, as well as from the inside of, an Atta laevigata nest. Juvenile frogs have been observed emerging from a nest of Atta sexdens.

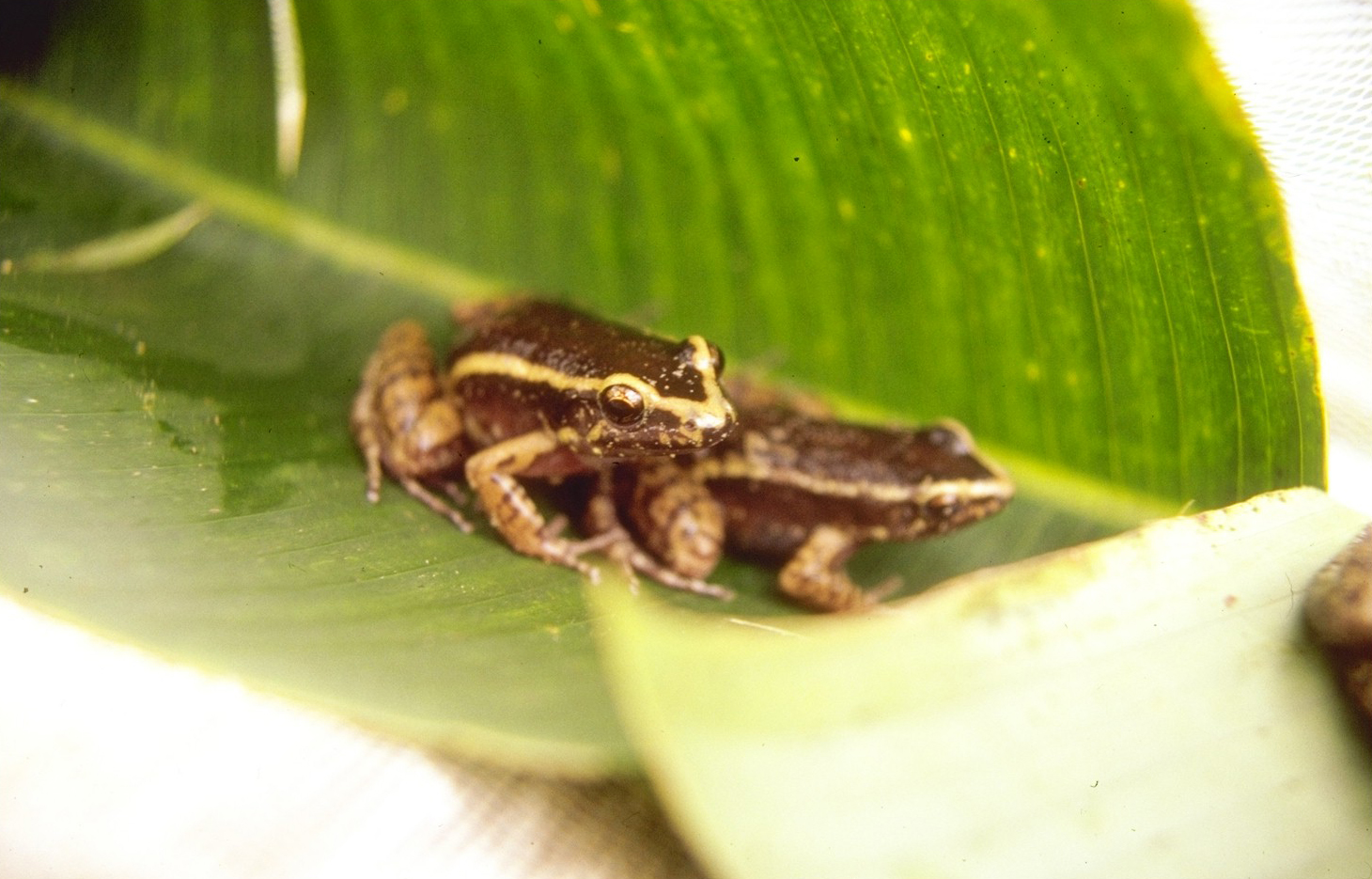
Lithodytes lineatus

== Parental Care ==
The exact mechanism by which Lithodytes lineatus constructs foam nests remains unknown. However, studies of foam nest construction by other Leptodactylidae frogs may offer some insight into the construction process. There are a variety of ways foam nests can be made, but the most common seem to start with the male and female in an amplexus mating position, with the male on top of the female and grasping it with his front legs. The pair rock back and forth, and the female discharges fertilized eggs and jelly. The male moves its legs in a motion resembling a windshield wiper, mixing air into the jelly to create foam around the fertilized eggs. This complete process takes around 4–5 seconds.

The foam nests of Lithodytes lineatus are found in dry areas or seasonally wet environments of high temperature and fluctuating water levels. It has been theorized that the foam prevents eggs from drying up, a disastrous result for the eggs. Additionally, foam nests provide a thermal environment of elevated temperature and moisture, which allow eggs and larvae to develop rapidly. The structure of foam nests allows rapid warming and slowed heat loss. The female frog stays in the center of the foam nest and guards against predators.

Studies on the composition of foam nests created by Leptodacylus vastus, a frog of the same family as Lithodytes lineatus, may lend some knowledge towards the chemical makeup of Leptodactylidae foam nests, which is still largely poorly understood. The general composition consists of a layer of surfactant proteins and a carbohydrate layer. The surfactant proteins are theorized to have both hydrophilic and hydrophobic domains located at the air-water interface, allowing the formation of foam. It is assumed that these proteins must also be soluble, catalytically efficient, and non-toxic to biological tissues. Lv-RSN-1 is a notable surfactant protein since it was found to make up around 45% of the total protein composition. Assays performed on this protein revealed that the presence of multiple disulfide bridges in its structure conveys high stability. This also explains resistance to heat denaturation. Along with other proteins in the nest, Lv-RSN-1 offers protection against heat and UV radiation.

The foamy consistency of the nest deters a variety of predators. Snakes cannot easily swallow the nest, mammals, on the other hand, pay little attention, and insects such as ants, wasps, and beetles often become trapped in the foam and die.

== Social Behavior ==
=== Reproductive Behavior ===
Male frogs in competition have been observed to face each other when calling for mates. Their snouts oppose and almost touch each other. Males can hold this position, in the same location, for 7 consecutive nights. These male frogs call in a rapid and alternating manner, generating a two-note call. The persistence of callings while facing each other suggest strong competition for mates as well as competition among males themselves. Such behavior continues without disturbance, even in the presence of close observation by humans and flashlights.

Lithodytes lineatus breed during the rainy season, with pregnant females and calling males most frequently found during this time and juvenile frogs captured mostly towards the end of the season. Like other species, this behavior is probably due to the requirement for standing water for development of frog larvae. It is notable that larger females lay more eggs than their smaller counterparts.

Mating adults are most commonly found on the forest floor calling in close proximity to Atta nests. Large ant nests usually have multiple calling frogs.

=== Defensive Behavior ===
This species employs deimatic behavior as a defense strategy. During this defense, the head is lowered and rear lifted by vertical stretching of the legs. This defensive position protects the head from attack and exposes the aposematic colors of the inner thighs to potential predators. The nictitating membrane of eyes is also closed for protection during such deimatic behavior.

The frog produces short and high-pitched calls when captured by predators and in distress. They also emit foamy, viscous skin secretions that have a strong bitter smell under stressful conditions.

Researchers have shown that the ability of L. lineatus to safely exist in leaf-cutting Atta ant nests is connected to a biochemical compounds present in the skin of L. lineatus. The exact chemical responsible for such protection against ants has yet to be determined, but this chemical produces a distinct odor. Species closely related to Lithodytes lineatus (Adenomera, Allobates femoralis, and Ameerega picta) are heavily attacked by leafcutter ants while L. lineatus frogs are unaffected. When coated with L. lineatus skin extracts, Rhinella major frogs are significantly protected from ant attack. There is no observable difference between male and female skin extracts, suggesting that both sexes secrete the compound required to prevent attack by leafcutter ants.

This phenomenon is not specific to L. lineatus as similar observations have been recorded in Phrynomantis microps, the West-African savanna frog, and Paltothyreus tarsatus, commonly known as Ponerine ants. Recent studies have identified potential amino acids responsible for the lack of attack by these Ponerine ants. These peptides were similarly studied as those in L. lineatus and when skin extract from P. microps was used to coat termites, the ants would no longer attack these termites. Thus, similar resistance against ant attack was conferred through the skin extracts of these frogs. Researchers hypothesize that these peptides act as "appeasement allomones" and have potential applications in the reduction of insect aggression.

=== Foraging Behavior ===
Adults usually hunt at night and are sometimes found away from shelter and residence, typically for the purpose of foraging.

== Mimicry ==
=== Batesian mimicry ===
Lithodytes lineatus has been considered non-toxic and its morphological similarity to the poison dart frog Ameerega picta has resulted in conclusions of Batesian mimicry between the two organisms. However, studies of the skin and poison glands of L. lineatus revealed a limited diversity of proteins and peptides that potentially have toxic effects. Comparisons of skin and glands between L. lineatus and A. picta show differences in gland shape, distribution, concentration, and in type of granule secreted. The poison of A. picta, unlike that of L. lineatus, contains no proteins and is instead composed of alkaloids and carbohydrates.

Furthermore, the poison glands of L. lineatus are concentrated in the head and colored bands of the dorsum (yellow stripes and orange spots). This localization of poison glands in L. lineatus is unlike A. picta and most anurans, which possess a homogenous distribution of glands. Such localized distribution signals to predators that poison is actually located at the colored stripes and spots. A high concentration of glands on the head is theorized to be a result of frog predators starting consumption of anurans at the head.

=== Müllerian mimicry ===
The recent finding of potentially poisonous characteristics in L. lineatus has resulted in a re-definition of the association between this species and A. picta. Predators could learn to avoid the shared color patterns between these two species, resulting in Müllerian mimicry.

== Use in Research ==
Analysis of anuran skin secretion chemical composition is important and is commonly done because substances found in such secretions can potentially serve as antimicrobials. Benzocaine, a local anesthetic, is frequently orally administered in lethal dosages to humanely kill anurans for study. However, the use of this anesthetic was temporarily a cause for concern in 2018 due to the finding of benzocaine in the skin extracts of the species Melanophryniscus moreirae and Lithobates clamitans, potentially invalidating many compositional studies of skin extracts. Fortunately, it was confirmed in 2020 that orally administered gel benzocaine did not result in the detection of any benzocaine in the skin of Lithodytes lineatus. Benzocaine in liquid form could result in false positives, but benzocaine in gel form applied at toxic doses in the mouths of frogs does not impact the chemical compositions of frog skin extracts and also should not confound any assays done with skin extracts.
