= Iarupea luisae =

Scientific classification
- Kingdom: Animalia
- Phylum: Arthropoda
- Clade: Pancrustacea
- Class: Insecta
- Order: Coleoptera
- Suborder: Polyphaga
- Infraorder: Scarabaeiformia
- Family: Scarabaeidae
- Genus: Iarupea
- Species: I. luisae

Binomial name
- Iarupea luisae Stebnicka, 2007

Species of beetle

Iarupea luisae is a species of beetle of the family Scarabaeidae. It is found in Brazil (Maranhão).

== Description ==
Adults reach a length of about 4.8–5 mm (0.19–0.20 in). The body is dark reddish brown. The frons is coarsely punctate and the pronotum is densely punctate with large punctures and with clearly explanate lateral margins.

== Life history ==
Specimens have been collected in mangrove areas and extracted from the nests of Atta species.
