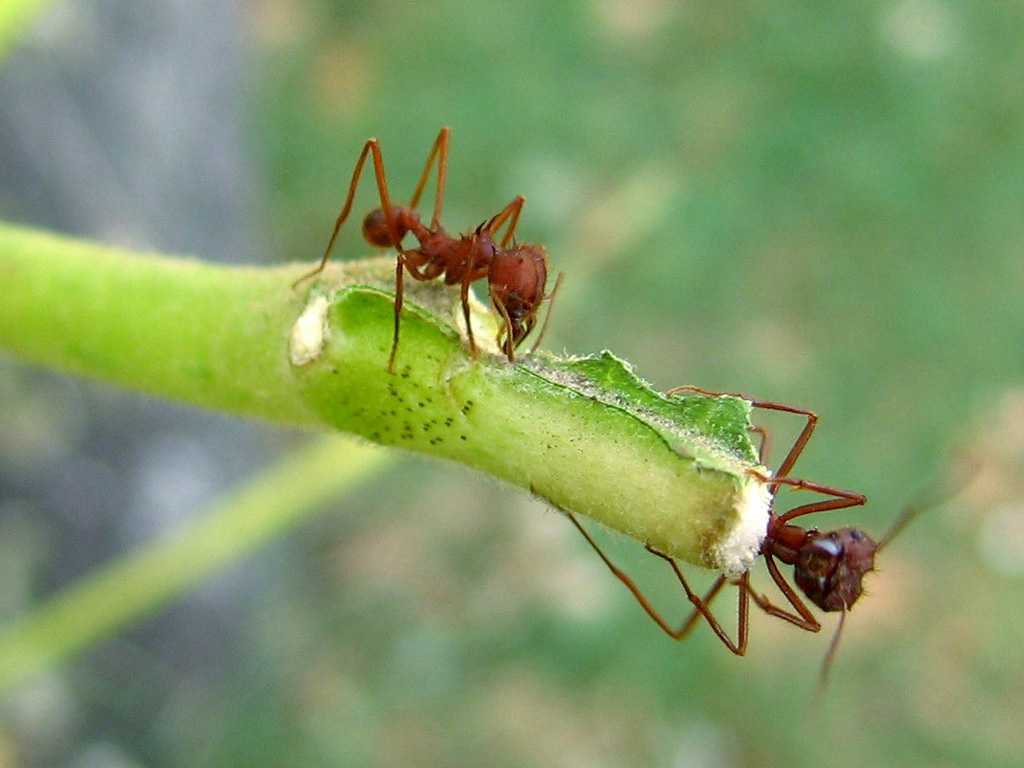
- Harvesting from a catalpa tree

Scientific classification
- Kingdom: Animalia
- Phylum: Arthropoda
- Clade: Pancrustacea
- Class: Insecta
- Order: Hymenoptera
- Family: Formicidae
- Subfamily: Myrmicinae
- Genus: Atta
- Species: A. texana

Binomial name
- Atta texana Buckley, 1860

= Texas leafcutter ant =

Species of ant

The Texas leafcutter ant (Atta texana) is a species of fungus-farming ant in the subfamily Myrmicinae. It is found in Texas, Louisiana, and north-eastern Mexico. Other common names include town ant, parasol ant, fungus ant, cut ant, and night ant. It harvests leaves from over 200 plant species, and is considered a major pest of agricultural and ornamental plants, as it can defoliate a citrus tree in less than 24 hours. Every colony has several queens and up to 2 million workers. Nests are built in well-drained, sandy or loamy soil, and may reach a depth of 6 m (20 ft), have 1000 entrance holes, and occupy 420 m^{2} (4,500 ft^{2}).

== Description ==
Workers measure 3 to 18 mm (0.12 to 0.71 in) in length, and are highly polymorphic. The back of the thorax has three pairs of spines. The ant has a narrow waist and is rusty brown in color. Its closely related cousin, Atta mexicana has colonies up to 8 million, and the queen for A. mexicana is larger than the M. texana queen. Atta mexicana is only able to have a single queen, while A. texana may have multiple queens (often 2). This makes the species polygyne and because of this trait, A. texana can form massive super colonies with upwards of 10,000,000 total ants in the colony. Because of the massive super colonies that they can form, they have been known to cause issues in the local environment and have been a troubling pest for humans living nearby these super colonies.

== Life cycle ==
The queen ant will deposit eggs that then hatch into cream-colored larvae. Larvae are typically 6 to 13 mm (0.24 to 0.51 in) long. Following several molts, a larva enters the pupa stage wherein it spins a silky cocoon around itself and metamorphosizes into an adult. In the spring, some larvae develop into larger (up to 18 mm or 0.71 in) winged male and female ants called alates. Male alates have much smaller heads than do females and both have long, brownish-yellow wings.

== Behavior ==
The nuptial flights of A. texana synchronize in regions; the virgin queens and males fly at night. Their foraging type is Mass Recruitment (MR). The Mass Recruitment foraging type consists of many ants all going out into one big group and searching for food.
