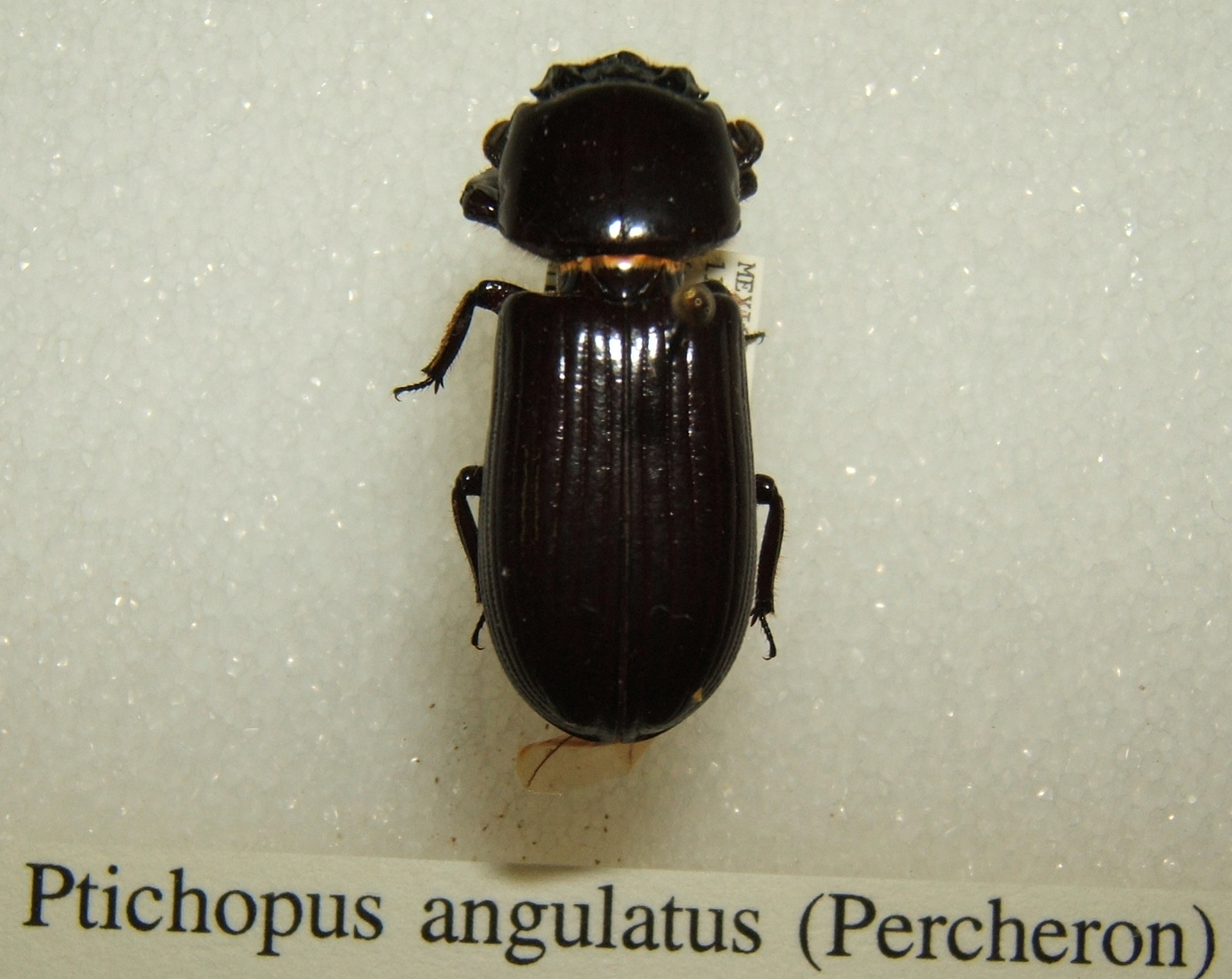
- Ptichopus angulatus, adult

Scientific classification
- Kingdom: Animalia
- Phylum: Arthropoda
- Clade: Pancrustacea
- Class: Insecta
- Order: Coleoptera
- Suborder: Polyphaga
- Infraorder: Scarabaeiformia
- Family: Passalidae
- Genus: Ptichopus
- Species: P. angulatus

Binomial name
- Ptichopus angulatus (Percheron, 1835)

Synonyms
- Passalus angulatus Percheron, 1835

= Ptichopus angulatus =

Species of beetle

Ptichopus angulatus is a beetle of the family Passalidae. It is widely distributed in Central America and Mexico and also reported from northern Colombia. It is associated with nests of Atta leafcutter ants: all life stages live in the nest detritus. The eyes are small and reduced.

== Gallery ==
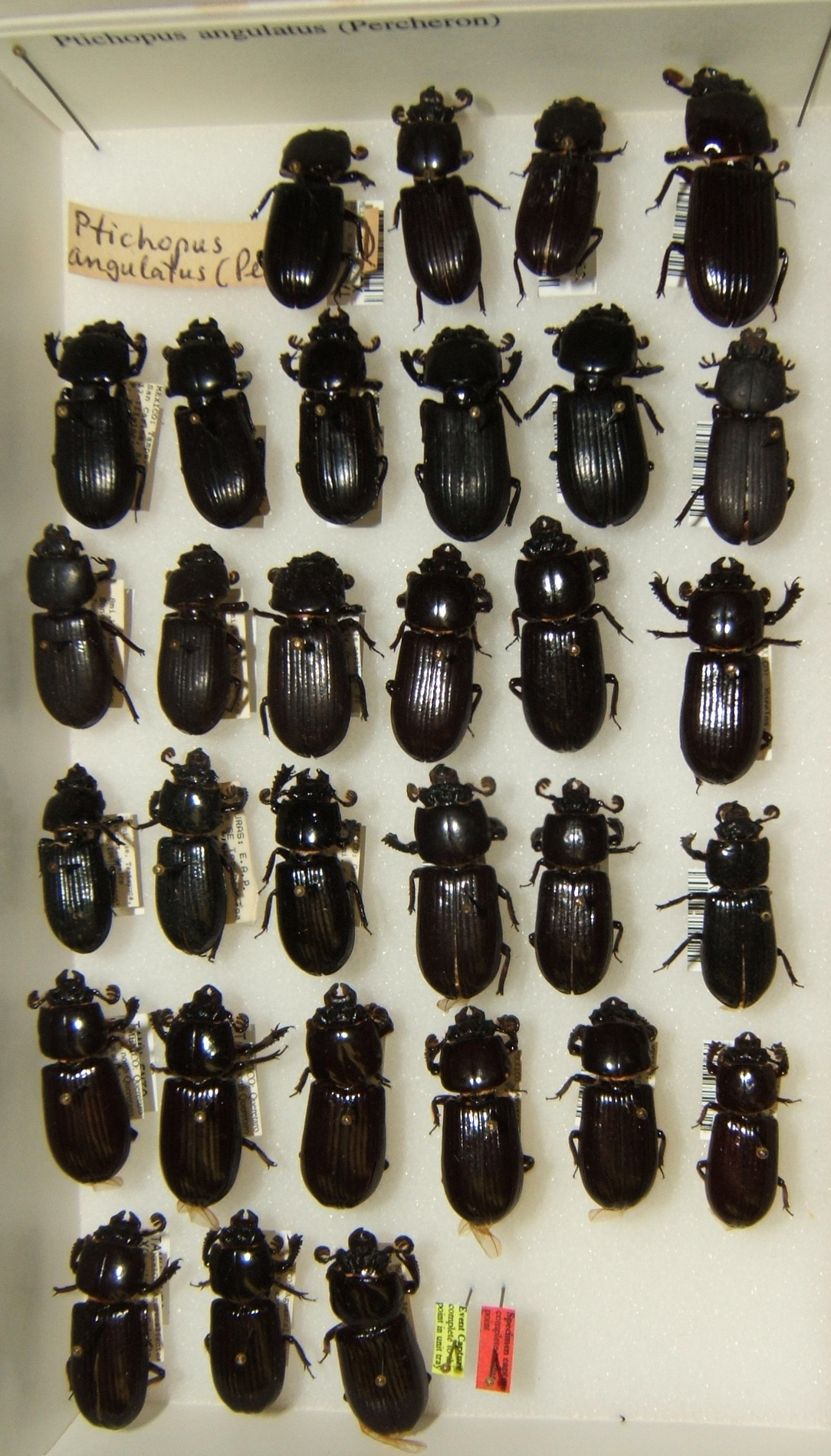
Specimen collection
