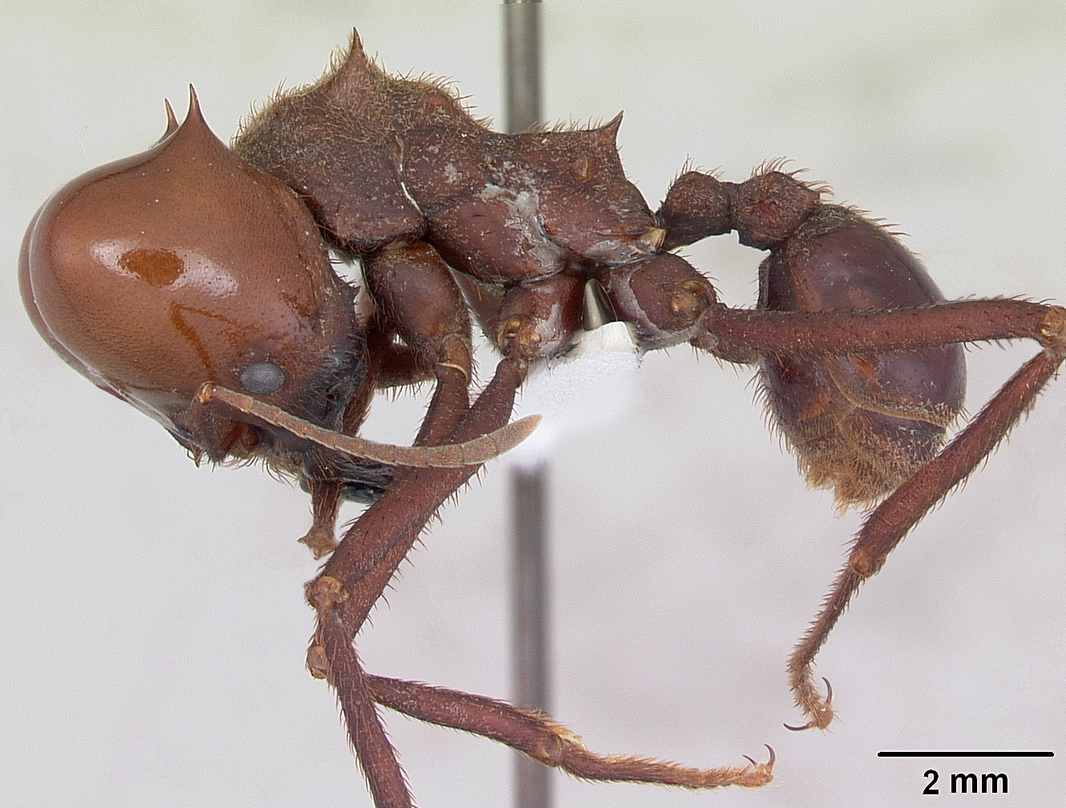
- A. laevigata worker

Scientific classification
- Kingdom: Animalia
- Phylum: Arthropoda
- Clade: Pancrustacea
- Class: Insecta
- Order: Hymenoptera
- Family: Formicidae
- Subfamily: Myrmicinae
- Genus: Atta
- Species: A. laevigata

Binomial name
- Atta laevigata (Smith, 1858)

= Atta laevigata =

Species of ant

Atta laevigata (Smith, 1858) is one of about a dozen species of leafcutter ants in the genus Atta, found from Venezuela and south to Paraguay. This species is one of the largest leafcutter species, and can be recognized by the smooth and shining head of the largest workers in a colony. Atta laevigata is known in northern South America as hormiga culona (literally translated as "big-assed ant"), or as sikisapa in Peru, bachaco culón in Venezuela, akango in Paraguay. In Brazil they are known as "saúva-cabeça-de-vidro" (literally "glass-headed saúva"), with saúva being the common name for all Atta ants. Other Atta species are called zompopo de mayo in Central America and chicatana in Mexico.

The colony sizes of these ants are made up of around 3.5 million individuals.

== Cuisine ==
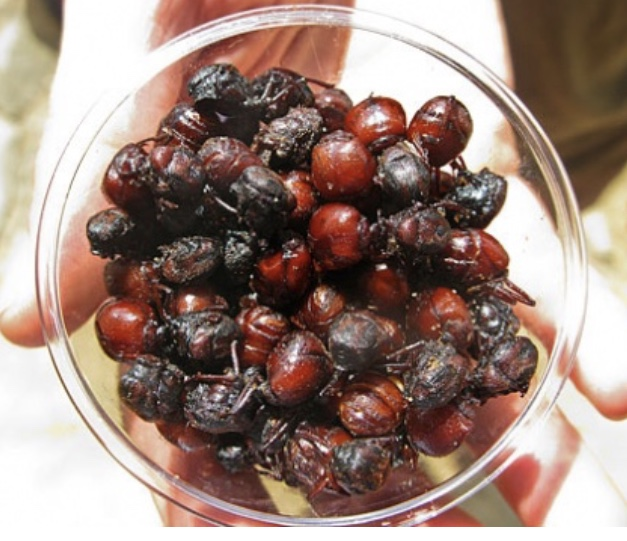
Hormiga culona

The hormiga culona has been eaten for hundreds (if not thousands) of years, as a tradition inherited from pre-colonial cultures such as the Guanes. The ants are harvested for about nine weeks during the rainy season every year, at the time when they make their nuptial flight. A. laevigata are used as traditional gifts in weddings. There are local superstitions and beliefs regarding the ants as aphrodisiacs.

The harvesting is done by local workers, who are often bitten by the ants with their strong mandibles. Only the queen ants are collected, as the other ants within a colony are not considered edible. The legs and wings are removed, at which point the ants are soaked in salty water, before being roasted in ceramic pans. The main centers of production for hormigas culonas are the municipalities of San Gil and Barichara. From there, the trade of the ants is extended to Bucaramanga and Bogotá, where the packages containing ants are often seen during the rainy season. The primary exporting of the product is to Canada, England and Japan.

Analyses conducted at the Industrial University of Santander, on the nutritional value of the ants, show high levels of protein, very low levels of saturated fat, and an overall decent nutritional value.

Atta laevigata is a temporary source of income for the poorer people of the department. The harvesting of the ant queens (as well as the competition for resources with more aggressive species of leafcutter-ants/"arrieras") causes a progressive decrease of the ant populations, as estimated in recent studies; according to observations, only a sixth of the ant population of twelve years ago exists today, and for this reason, there is concern about the species' future.
