= Iarupea serratipennis =

Scientific classification
- Kingdom: Animalia
- Phylum: Arthropoda
- Clade: Pancrustacea
- Class: Insecta
- Order: Coleoptera
- Suborder: Polyphaga
- Infraorder: Scarabaeiformia
- Family: Scarabaeidae
- Genus: Iarupea
- Species: I. serratipennis

Binomial name
- Iarupea serratipennis (Petrovitz, 1973)

Synonyms
- Euparia serratipennis Petrovitz, 1973

Species of beetle

Iarupea serratipennis is a species of beetle of the family Scarabaeidae. It is found in Argentina, Bolivia, Brazil (Acre, Amazonas, Distrito Federal, Espírito Santo, Maranhão, Mato Grosso, Mato Grosso do Sul, Minas Gerais, Piauí, Rio de Janeiro, Rondônia, Santa Catarina) and Paraguay.

== Description ==
Adults reach a length of about 4.5–5 mm (0.18–0.20 in). The body is dark reddish brown. The head has longitudinal wrinkles and the clypeus is emarginate. The pronotum has coarse, big and wide punctures, with the margins between the punctures sometimes obsolete, giving the pronotal surface a wrinkled appearance.

== Life history ==
Specimens have been collected in Urochloa decumbens pastures and extracted from Bubalus bubalis faecal masses. Specimens were also collected in the nests of Atta sexdens.
