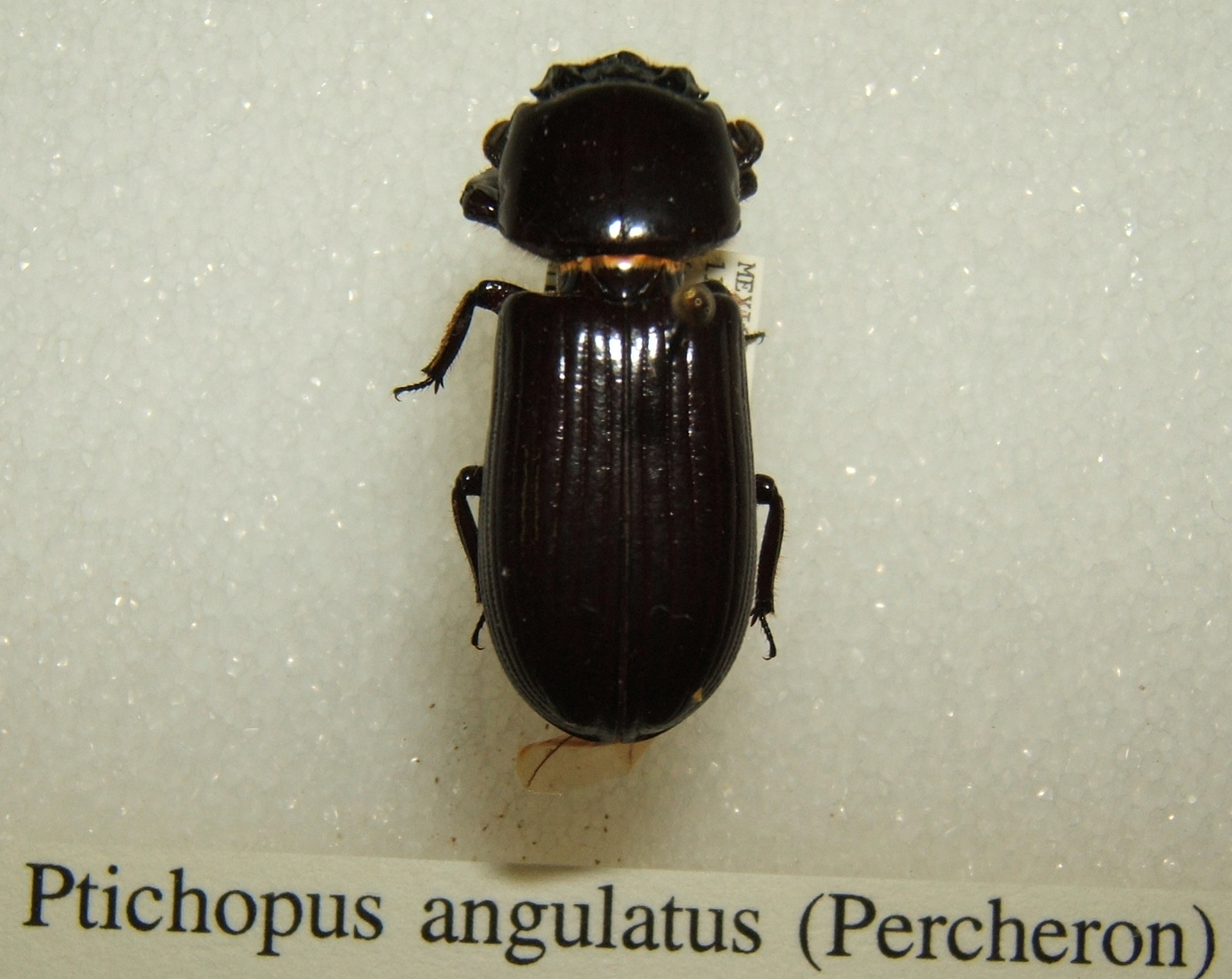
- Ptichopus angulatus

Scientific classification
- Kingdom: Animalia
- Phylum: Arthropoda
- Class: Insecta
- Order: Coleoptera
- Suborder: Polyphaga
- Infraorder: Scarabaeiformia
- Family: Passalidae
- Subfamily: Passalinae
- Genus: Ptichopus; Kaup, 1869

= Ptichopus =

Genus of beetles

Ptichopus is a genus of beetles of the family Passalidae. It is distributed in South America, Central America, and Mexico.

Unlike other passalid beetles that are associated with rotting wood, Ptichopus angulatus is associated with detritus of Atta leafcutter ant nests.

== Species ==
There are four recognized species:

- Ptichopus angulatus (Percheron, 1835)
- Ptichopus carajaensis Fonseca, 1993
- Ptichopus hylaius Fonseca & Reyes-Castillo, 1994
- Ptichopus melzeri Luederwaldt, 1927
