= Iarupea nigricans =

Scientific classification
- Kingdom: Animalia
- Phylum: Arthropoda
- Clade: Pancrustacea
- Class: Insecta
- Order: Coleoptera
- Suborder: Polyphaga
- Infraorder: Scarabaeiformia
- Family: Scarabaeidae
- Genus: Iarupea
- Species: I. nigricans

Binomial name
- Iarupea nigricans (Westwood, 1843)

Synonyms
- Euparia nigricans Westwood, 1843; Euparia attenuata Harold, 1870

Species of beetle

Iarupea nigricans is a species of beetle of the family Scarabaeidae. It is found in Brazil (Amazonas, Espírito Santo, Maranhão, Minas Gerais, Pará, Pernambuco, Santa Catarina), Colombia, Guyana and Suriname.

== Description ==
Adults reach a length of about 4.8–5 mm (0.19–0.20 in). The body is dark reddish brown, with the pronotum microreticulate and the elytra strongly shagreened. The frons has scarce punctures, while the punctures on the pronotum are large and oval, but closer and smaller near the anterior margin. Near the posterior margins, the punctures are larger and more widely spaced.

== Life history ==
Specimens have been collected in mangrove areas and from detritus cavities of the nests of Atta sexdens.
