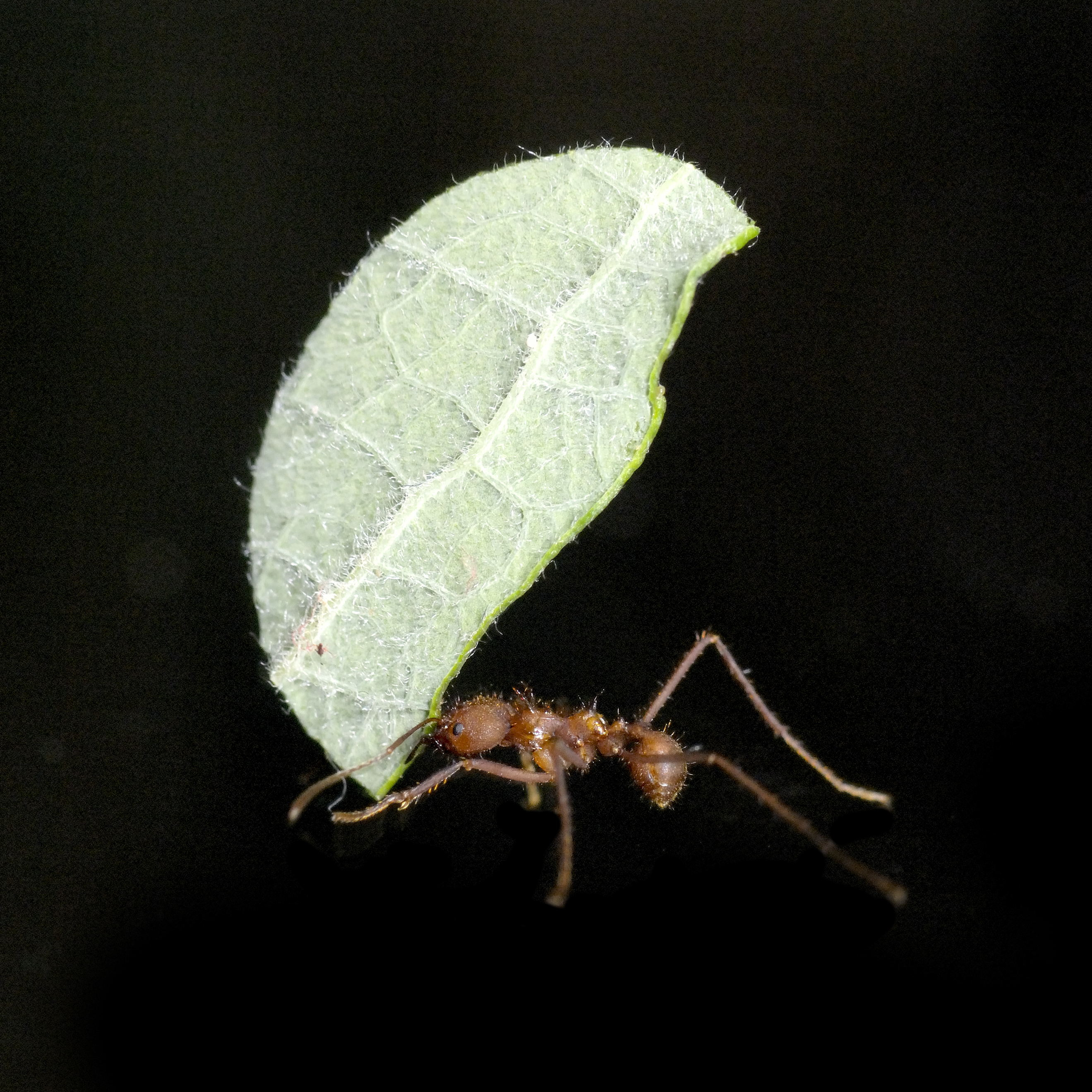
- Atta colombica carrying a leaf segment

Scientific classification
- Kingdom: Animalia
- Phylum: Arthropoda
- Clade: Pancrustacea
- Class: Insecta
- Order: Hymenoptera
- Family: Formicidae
- Subfamily: Myrmicinae
- Genus: Atta
- Species: A. colombica

Binomial name
- Atta colombica (Guérin-Méneville, 1844)

= Atta colombica =

Species of ant

Atta colombica (often misspelled Atta columbica) is one of 47 species of leafcutter ants. This species is part of the Attini tribe (the fungus-growing ants).

== Description ==
Workers of this species are maroon in colour, and are entirely matte, with no shiny spots.

== Distribution ==
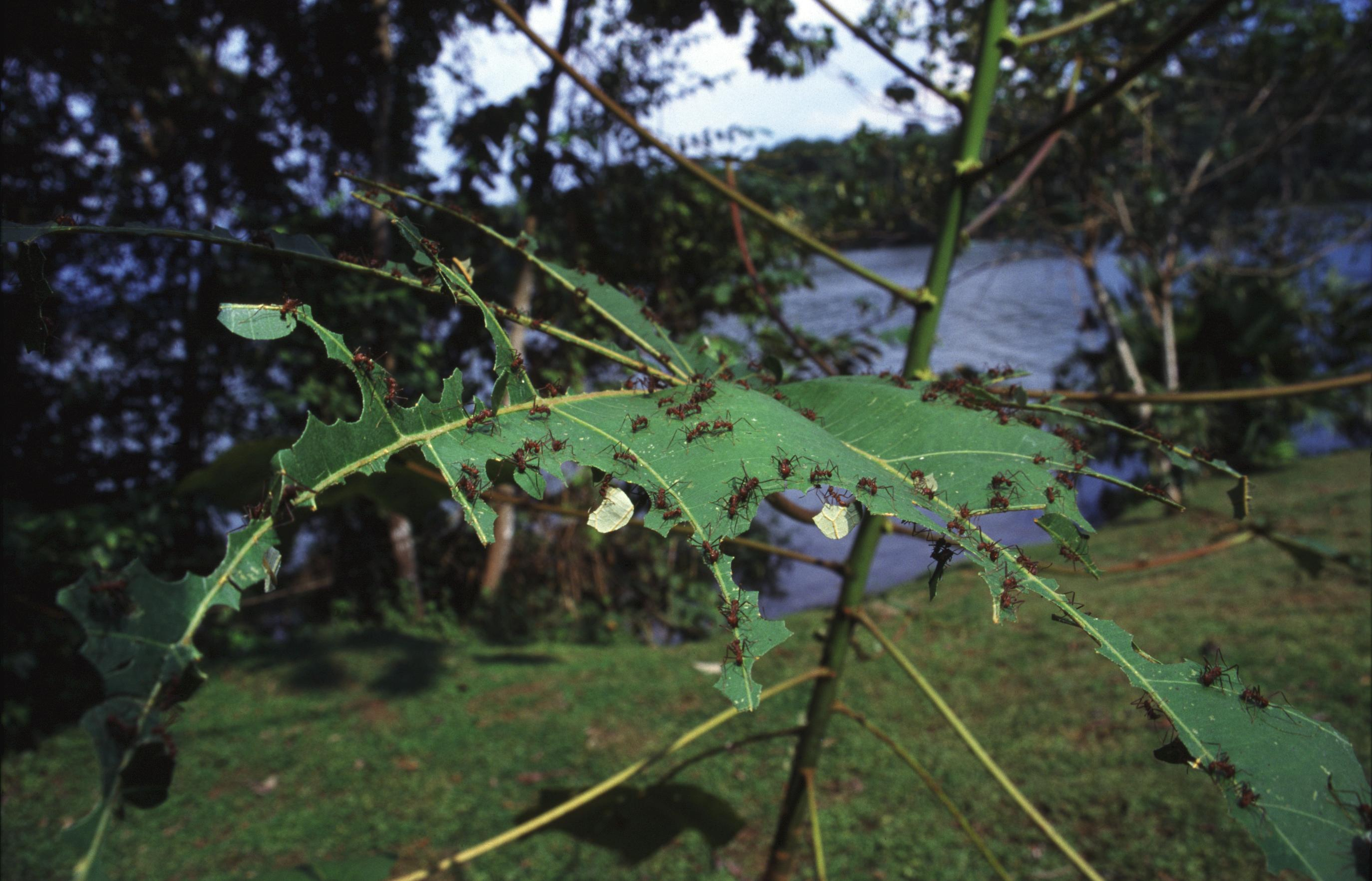
A. colombica cutting down a whole plant

This species ranges from Guatemala to Colombia, and can also be found in Costa Rica and Panama.

== Nests ==
A. colombica produces visible refuse dumps of spent fungus on the surface. These dumps often take the form of large, conical mounds, and are located to the side of the main soil mounds. Lines of workers carry the spent fungus from the nest to the dumps. They deposit the grayish-white pellets at the peak of the mounds, which produces the conical shape. This behaviour is different from A. cephalotes, which deposit their refuse in subterranean dumps.

The number of workers in a colony is estimated to be 1.0-2.5 million.

== Behavior ==
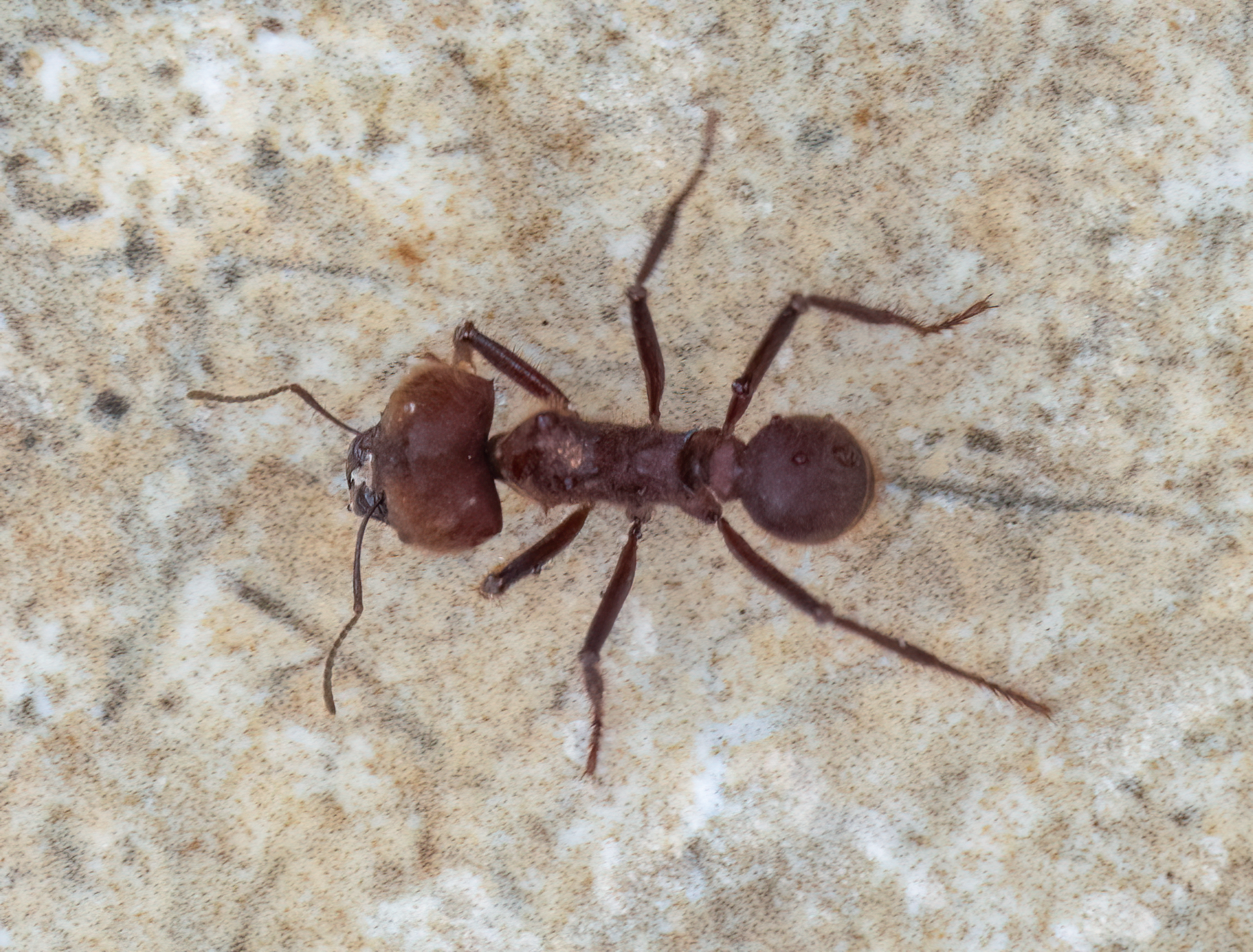
A. colombica soldier

A colony of A. colombica harvests, on average, 85–470 kg (187–1,036 lb) of plant biomass per year (dry weight), meaning they harvest a leaf area of about 835–4,550 m^{2} (8,990–48,980 ft^{2}) annually.

The average number of different active males in each colony is believed to be less than three. Due to the variation of shared paternity, though, colonies effectively contain two fathers.

Unlike the majority of Atta spp., that respond to colony threats from other ants with many small worker ants, A. colombica appears to recruit majors, or soldiers, for defense.
