= Iarupea goias =

Scientific classification
- Kingdom: Animalia
- Phylum: Arthropoda
- Clade: Pancrustacea
- Class: Insecta
- Order: Coleoptera
- Suborder: Polyphaga
- Infraorder: Scarabaeiformia
- Family: Scarabaeidae
- Genus: Iarupea
- Species: I. goias

Binomial name
- Iarupea goias Stebnicka, 2007

Species of beetle

Iarupea goias is a species of beetle of the family Scarabaeidae. It is found in Brazil (Goiás, Maranhão, Minas Gerais).

== Description ==
Adults reach a length of about 5 mm (0.20 in). The body is dark reddish brown. The pronotum has no punctures, but is covered with small tubercles and the posterior furrow is not strigate.

== Life history ==
Specimens have been collected in galleries of the nests of Atta species.
