= Iarupea =

Scientific classification
- Kingdom: Animalia
- Phylum: Arthropoda
- Clade: Pancrustacea
- Class: Insecta
- Order: Coleoptera
- Suborder: Polyphaga
- Infraorder: Scarabaeiformia
- Family: Scarabaeidae
- Subfamily: Aphodiinae
- Tribe: Eupariini
- Genus: Iarupea; Martinez, 1953

Synonyms
- Iarupoides Chalumeau, 1984

Genus of beetles

Iarupea is a genus of beetles of the family Scarabaeidae.

== Species ==
- Iarupea goias Stebnicka, 2007
- Iarupea lopeteguii Martinez, 1953
- Iarupea luisae Stebnicka, 2007
- Iarupea nigricans (Westwood, 1843)
- Iarupea serratipennis (Petrovitz, 1973)
