= Iarupea lopeteguii =

Scientific classification
- Kingdom: Animalia
- Phylum: Arthropoda
- Clade: Pancrustacea
- Class: Insecta
- Order: Coleoptera
- Suborder: Polyphaga
- Infraorder: Scarabaeiformia
- Family: Scarabaeidae
- Genus: Iarupea
- Species: I. lopeteguii

Binomial name
- Iarupea lopeteguii Martinez, 1953

Species of beetle

Iarupea lopeteguii is a species of beetle of the family Scarabaeidae. It is found in Argentina, Bolivia, Brazil (Mato Grosso) and Paraguay.

== Description ==
Adults reach a length of about 4.5–5 mm (0.18–0.20 in). The body is piceous. The pronotum is punctate throughout, with large, non-confluent and coarse punctures. There is a single tubercle on the posterior margin, near the posterior angles.

== Life history ==
Specimens have been collected in waste piles from nests of Atta vollenweideri.
