= Fungus pocket =

Fungus pockets are any of various convergently evolved inoculum-retention and -cultivation organs in a wide range of insect taxa. They are generally divided into mycangia (or "mycetangia") and infrabuccal pockets.

Fungus pockets are found in ambrosia beetles, bark beetles, termites and attine ants.
