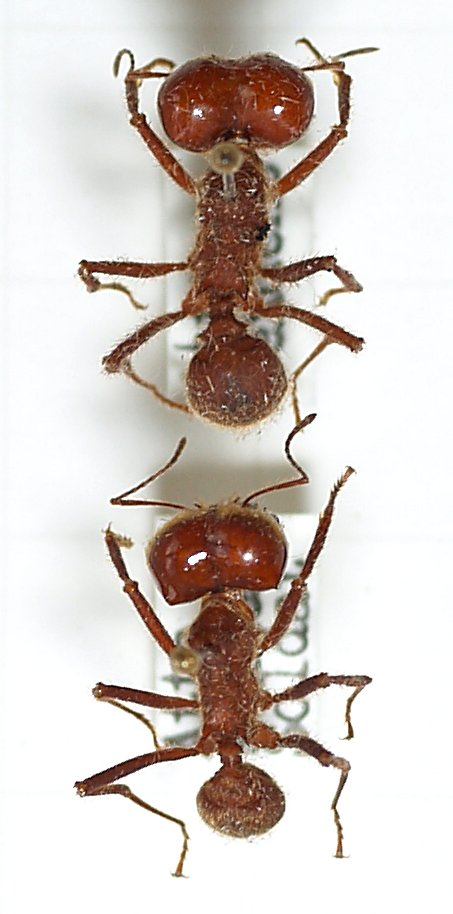
- A. sexdens soldier caste workers

Scientific classification
- Kingdom: Animalia
- Phylum: Arthropoda
- Class: Insecta
- Order: Hymenoptera
- Family: Formicidae
- Subfamily: Myrmicinae
- Genus: Atta
- Species: A. sexdens

Binomial name
- Atta sexdens (Linnaeus, 1758)

= Atta sexdens =

Species of ant

Atta sexdens is a species of leafcutter ant belonging to the tribe Attini, native to America, from the southern United States (Texas) to northern Argentina. They are absent from Chile. They cut leaves to provide a substrate for the fungus farms which are their principal source of food. Their societies are among the most complex found in social insects. A. sexdens is an ecologically important species, but also an agricultural pest. Other Atta species, such as Atta texana, Atta cephalotes and others, have similar behavior and ecology.

== Description ==
=== Colony architecture ===
A. sexdens colonies are primarily subterranean with a mound of excavated material on the surface. The diameter of the colony may reach 10 m with a depth of 6 m. The colonies contain up to 2000 chambers with a combined volume of more than 20 m^{3}. The two basic types of chambers are fungus farms and waste chambers. The farms contain the fungal culture which sustains the colony and hosts larvae and pupae. The waste chambers are located at the rim of the colony and are significantly larger. They are used to dispose used fungal culture and dead ants. A mature colony contains 5–8 million workers. The colony often forms the centerpiece of a large jungle clearing. At the top of the mound are structures resembling sand castles surrounding hundreds of openings to the colony. Positioning the openings on top of these structures minimises the amount of rainwater flowing into the colony. The openings also have an important role in air conditioning. As the ant activity and fungal metabolism heat up the colony, hot air rises through the central passageways. Simultaneously, fresh air is drawn in from the openings at the rim of the colony.

=== Anatomy ===
A. sexdens follows the basic body plan of ants fairly closely. They have sharp spikes or hooks rising from their heads and midsections to deter predators. Another distinguishing feature is a relatively large, two-lobed head. Its purpose is to accommodate the large muscles moving the well-developed mandibles.

In addition to the queen, the colony contains four castes of sterile female workers, and seasonally some winged virgin queens and males:

- Soldiers are the physically largest worker caste, with a head width of 3 mm and well-developed sharp mandibles. They are completely dedicated to defence, and do not participate in the running of the colony. In the event of attack by a predator, the soldiers storm out of the nest and attempt to overpower the aggressor. Their bite can easily penetrate human skin. The soldier caste is expensive to maintain, so they are absent from young colonies with less than 100,000 workers.
- Forager-excavators are the second-largest caste, with an average head width of 2.2 mm. They are responsible for venturing out to cut pieces of leaves and carry them back to the colony to feed the fungus. They also excavate new chambers to the colony.
- Within-nest specialists have an average head width of 1.4 mm. They usually remain inside the colony, where they process the leaf material brought in by the foragers to a smaller form. They also dispose of waste, help the gardener-nurse caste to take care of larger larvae, and attend to the queen.
- Gardener-nurses have an average head width of 1 mm. They are the physically smallest caste, less massive than the larger, more robust soldiers by a factor of several hundred. Their tasks are to attend to the fungal culture and to the developing eggs, larvae, and pupae.
- The queen is the largest ant in the colony, outweighing the smaller worker by a factor of 700. She is also the only member of the colony capable of reproducing. The queen resides in a special chamber, where she is continually fed, cleaned, and protected by workers. The queens have a lifespan of 10–20 years.

Considerable variation in size occurs within the castes, some of which may be related to the division of labour. Some researchers separate seven castes, while others dismiss the idea of caste altogether. The division of labour also depends on the age of the worker. Foraging expeditions are hazardous, so are handled by older, thus more expendable, members of the caste.

=== Development ===
A. sexdens, like all ants, has four stages of development: egg, larva, pupa, and adult. Their developmental larval stages are observed associated with fungal hyphae, and possess unique morphological features, compared to other ants. They are, like all hymenopterans, haplodiploid, meaning males are haploid (one of each chromosome) and females, including workers, are diploid (a pair of each chromosome). Sex is determined by the type of egg laid. Unfertilized eggs will turn out to be males, which are strictly used for mating and are short-lived. Fertilized eggs produce females. The caste of the resulting adult depends on environmental cues.

Three to four weeks after being laid, the egg hatches and a larva emerges. In Atta ants, the larvae are fed by secretions from gardener-nurse ants and trophic eggs (unfertilized eggs used as food). The larvae, after an additional three to four weeks pupate. Their pupae are cocoonless, as are all of the subfamily Myrmicinae. After three to four more weeks, the pupae hatch into adult workers.

A. sexdens larvae grow embedded in the fungal garden. Despite being surrounded by food, they are incapable of feeding themselves. Their adult sisters constantly feed and clean them. This is not a primitive feature. On the contrary, only the most advanced ant societies can expend such lavish care to their offspring as required by Atta larvae.

All female eggs are identical when laid. The caste of the resulting worker is determined by the conditions, which are in turn regulated by adult workers. The most important factor is the quantity of food. The largest amount of food results in virgin queens, while slightly less food creates soldiers. A shortage of one caste causes the workers to produce more ants of that caste. A drastic reduction in the work force may cause the colony to revert to the caste structure of a young colony, which does not have soldiers.

== Behavior ==
=== Foraging ===
A. sexdens workers forage leaves up to a range of 60 m from the colony. The scouting workers leave behind a trail of pheromones after they discover a source of suitable plant material. Other workers follow this trail to the leaves. They cut the plant material to pieces suitable for an individual ant to carry back to the colony.

Smaller workers sometimes ride on the leaf pieces while the foragers carry them. The purpose of this behavior is not known for certain, but may be to protect the exposed foragers from attacks by parasitic insects. These insects include flies of the family Phoridae which lay their eggs on foragers. The resulting larvae eat the ants alive.

=== Fungus cultivation ===
A. sexdens, like all leafcutter ants, is mycophagic. They live in a symbiotic relationship with a fungus belonging to the subphylum Basidiomycota. Leaves and other soft plant material brought into the nest by the foragers is chewed into a pulp and fertilized with faeces. A small piece of fungus is placed on this substrate. The gardener-nurse caste takes care of the cultivation, transplanting fungus onto fresh substrate and weeding out wrong species of fungus, such as a parasitic Escovopsis, which sometimes can contaminate nests. They also use secretions from their salivary glands and help form antibiotic-producing Streptomyces bacteria to keep their fungal gardens a strict monoculture.

The gardener-nurses also cut pieces of mycelium for the other castes to eat. In addition to the fungus, the A. sexdens adults feed on plant sap. They are the only source of nutrition for the ants, apart from the trophic eggs laid by the queen when the colony is young.

The identity of the fungus remains a mystery. It is known that they are a species of the basidiomycete family Lepiotaceae. Some researchers believe all fungus-growing ants cultivate just one species, Leucocoprinus gongylophorus. The fungus produces special structures, called gongylidia, which have evolved to be eaten by ants.

=== Cleaning ===
A. sexdens workers spend a considerable time cleaning each other and the queen. They also spread antibiotic secretions from their metapleural glands on their bodies. Dirt collected by licking is stored in the workers' infrabuccal cavities, which are special recesses in their mouths. The purpose of these activities is to avoid infections, especially by parasitic fungi. Several fungus species, such as Cordyceps, specially infect and kill ants.

All waste in the nest, including infrabuccal pellets, spent substrate from the gardens, and dead ants are carried in the waste chambers to avoid contamination. Feces, however, are not carried away, but used to fertilise the fungal gardens. The waste chambers are larger than the human head and located at the rim of the colony. There, the waste can decompose without endangering the ants. Due to the high concentration of various nutrients in the decomposing waste, a thick net of plant roots usually permeates the compost.

=== Reproduction ===
From late October to mid-December, the A. sexdens colonies produce winged virgin queens and males. Before the nuptial flight, young queens visit the colony's fungal gardens and place a small piece of fungal mycelium in their infrabuccal cavities. During their nuptial flights, the queens mate with several males, which die shortly after. The queen retains the sperm in a special organ for the rest of her life.

It is estimated that each queen is inseminated by 3-8 males and that the number of fathers per colony is between 1 and 5.

The mated queen lands on the ground and tears off her now-unnecessary wings. Then she digs a vertical tunnel to a depth of about 30 cm. At the end of the tunnel, she excavates a small chamber. The queen then starts a fungal garden using the piece brought from her birth colony. Usually, the garden is fertilized only with feces, but sometimes it is necessary for the queen to forage a small quantity of plant material. The queen also lays a few eggs.

The queen then tends to the fungal garden and the developing larvae, feeding them fungus and trophic eggs. The queen herself eats nothing during this period, sustaining herself on fat deposits and her shrinking flight muscles. After the first brood of workers is ready, they take over the running of the fledgling colony and the queen becomes strictly an egg-laying machine. This process takes 40–60 days.

At first, the colony grows slowly, but after two to three years, the growth becomes faster. One possible reason for this is, before the colony is established enough to sustain any large soldier-caste workers, it is useful to remain unnoticed. Soldiers usually appear when the colony has a population of about 100,000. After the number of workers reaches 5–8 million, the colony stops expanding and diverts resources into producing queens and males.

The virgin queens are very rarely successful. Assuming the number of colonies in an area remains constant over time, on average only one queen among the many thousands sent out by a colony successfully founds a new one. However, a mature colony of several million workers faces very few dangers. No known predator, except the mostly subterranean army ant Nomamyrmex esenbeckii, actively attacks the nests, and even other highly aggressive army ants show a healthy respect for an A. sexdens colony. If spared from floods and human activity, the colony is usually destroyed only when the queen dies of old age, giving a successful colony a lifespan of 10–20 years. In that time, the colony will have sent out numerous males and virgin queens to found new colonies.

== Significance ==
=== Ecological impact ===
At the end of its lifespan, an A. sexdens colony has moved up to 40,000 kg of soil. This has two important results: The soil becomes aerated with the excavation of tunnels and chambers, and enriched with nutrients as the ants bury their waste products. This represents a major way in which nutrients are recycled in their environment.

A. sexdens and other leafcutter ants are also important herbivores, consuming 12–17% of the leaf mass-produced in neotropical rainforests. One colony's consumption of plant material is comparable to that of a large mammalian herbivore, such as a cow. A. sexdens and the related species, A. cephalotes are the principal insect pests where they are found, destroying billions of dollars' worth of crops with their ability to quickly defoliate and strip crops of anything useful to the ants. In fact, Atta ants are considered the primary herbivorous pest in many areas where they are found.

If A. sexdens were to spread into tropical Africa, the results are speculated to be devastating. As the local plants have not developed defensive compounds against leafcutters and Africa does not have parasites evolved to infect them, the results for both the ecosystem and agriculture would be disastrous.
