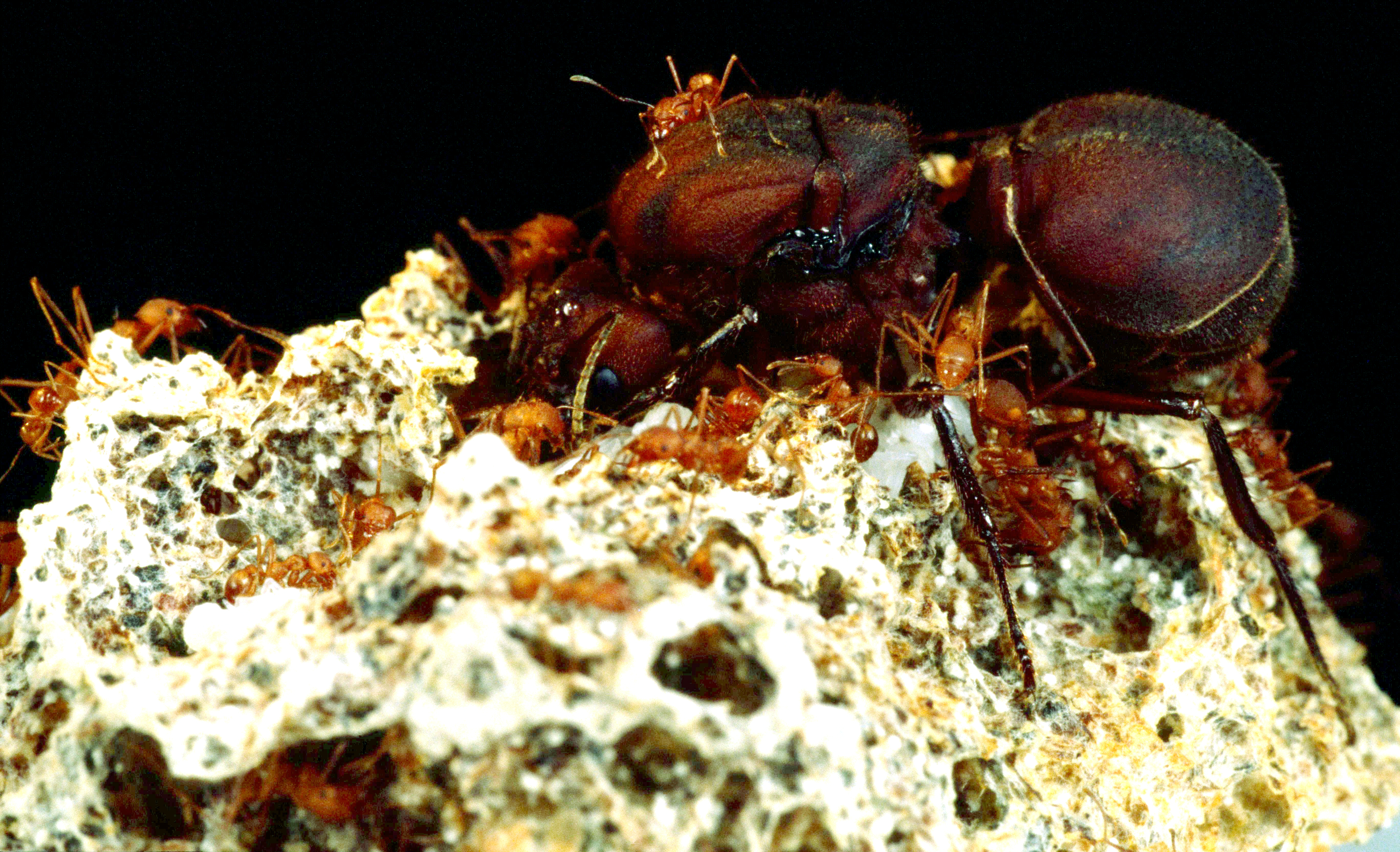
- Queen of Atta colombica tending her fungus

Scientific classification
- Kingdom: Animalia
- Phylum: Arthropoda
- Clade: Pancrustacea
- Class: Insecta
- Order: Hymenoptera
- Family: Formicidae
- Subfamily: Myrmicinae
- Tribe: Attini
- Genus: Atta; Fabricius, 1805

Type species
- Atta cephalotes (Linnaeus, 1758)

Diversity
- 17 species

Synonyms
- Archeatta Gonçalves, 1942; Epiatta Borgmeier, 1950; Neoatta Gonçalves, 1942; Oecodoma Latreille, 1818; Palaeatta Borgmeier, 1950

= Atta (ant) =

Genus of ants

Atta is a genus of ants found in South, Central, and southern North America (including the Caribbean). They belong to the subfamily Myrmicinae. Atta are commonly referred to as leafcutter ants, although that name is shared with members of the genus Acromyrmex.

Atta are notable for their feeding habits. Worker ants gather plant material from around their colony and carry it into the colony's underground chambers. The organic material feeds symbiotic fungi growing inside of the colony, which the ants consume. Atta do not sting, but they are known to be strong biters.

== Life cycle ==
As with all ants, Atta species undergo complete metamorphosis. They emerge from their eggs as a larva, which grows until it forms a pupa. Finally, the adult form emerges from the pupa.

== Castes ==
Adult Atta ants are divided into different castes with distinct appearances and duties.

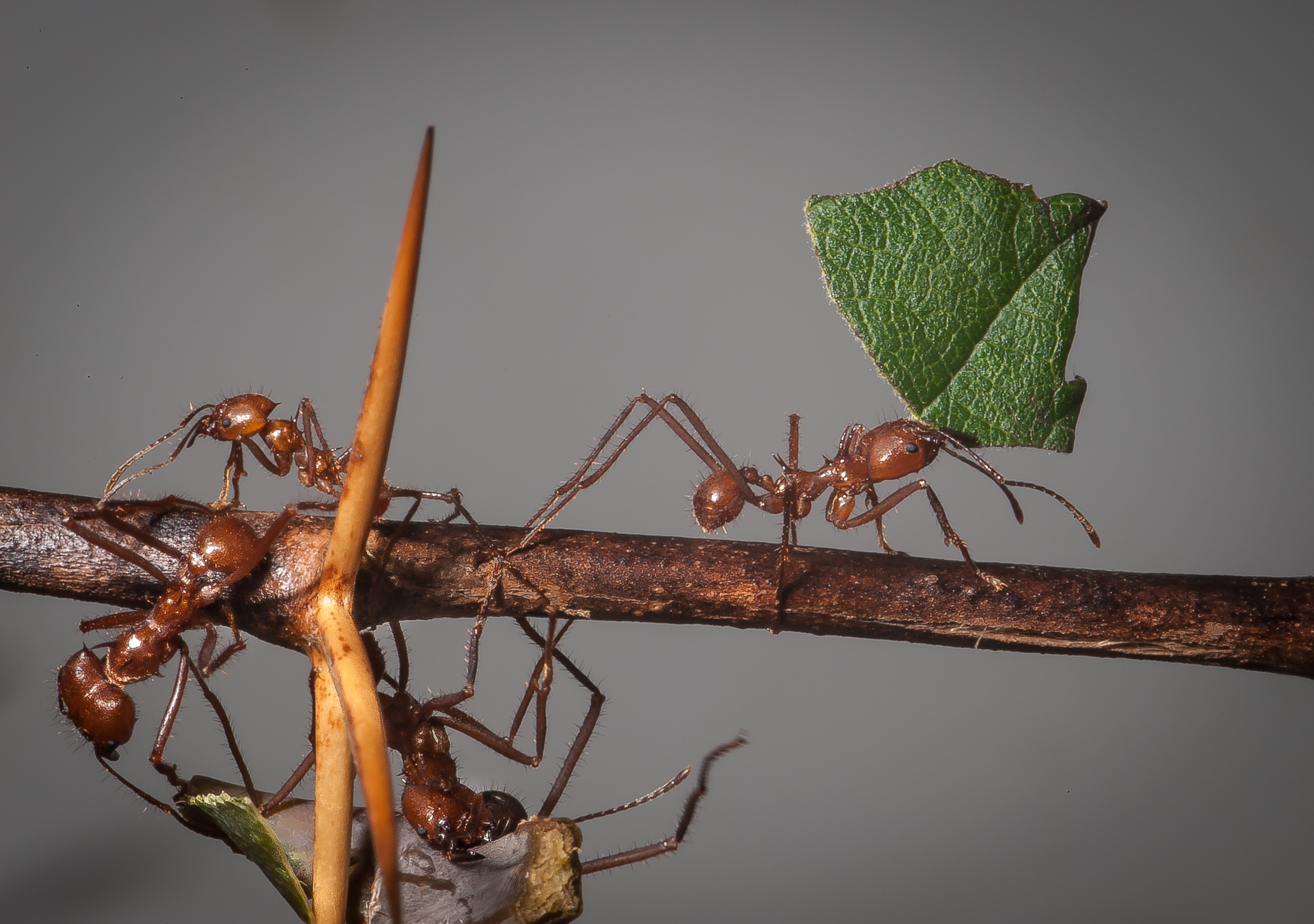
Atta cephalotes, Wilhelma Zoo, Stuttgart, Germany

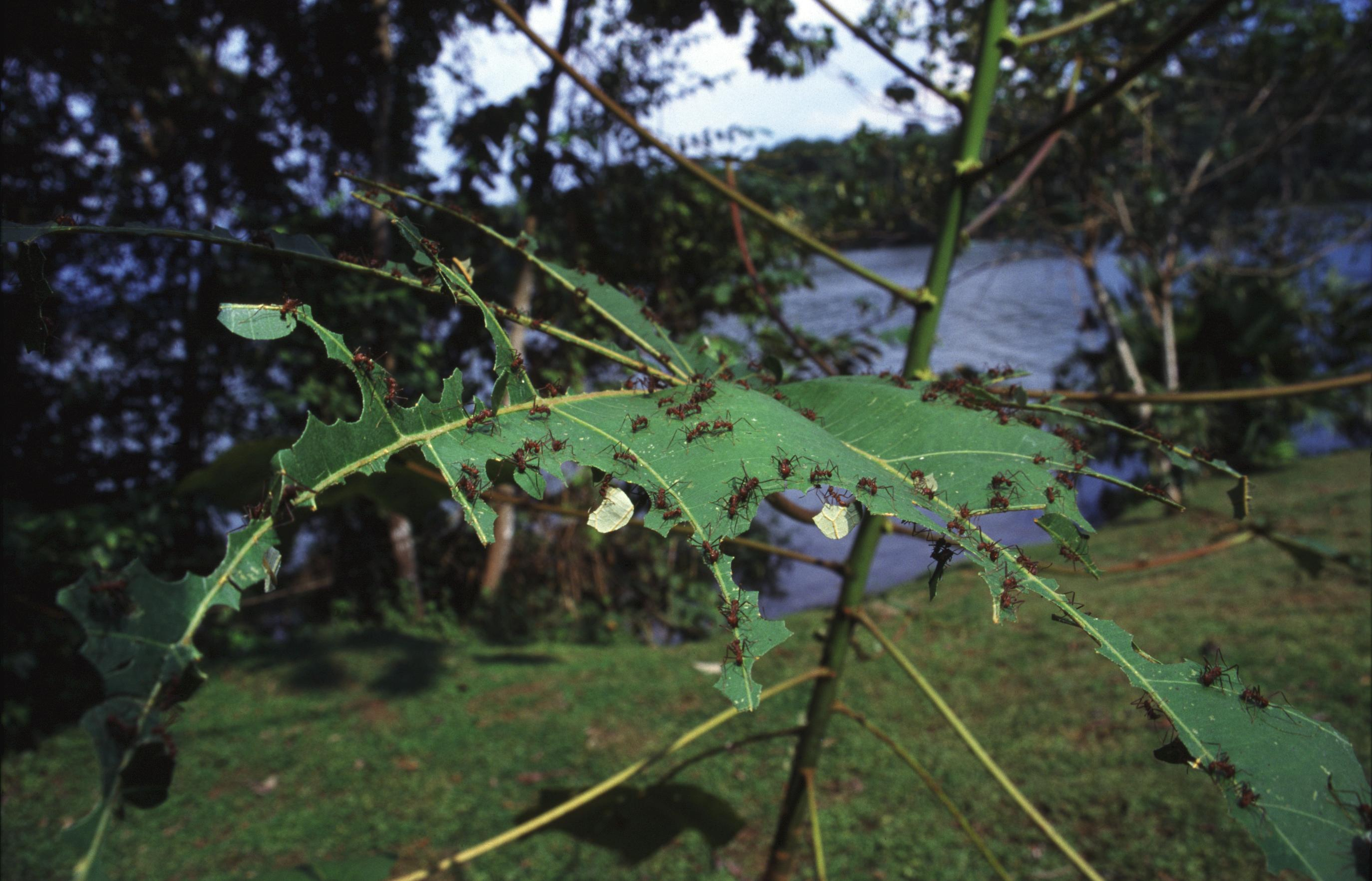
Workers of Atta colombica cutting tree leaves

=== Workers ===
Most ants in an Atta colony belong to the worker caste. Workers are wingless females who cannot sexually reproduce. They gather food, excavate the nest, and care for the queen and brood. Mature colonies of Atta ants can consist of millions of workers.

Physically distinct forms have also been recognized within the worker and larva castes. A study of Atta sexdens found that among larvae there are two distinct forms: gardeners/nurses and within-nest generalists.

A line of Atta workers carrying cut pieces of leaves

=== Soldiers ===
The soldier caste is responsible for the colony's defense. Like workers, soldiers are wingless and sexless. While some recognize soldiers as a distinct class, they are often considered a sub-caste of workers. Soldiers appear among lines of workers carrying their leaf fragments. They are recognizable by their conspicuously larger size, more formidable spines, and very large heads. These large heads house the muscles used for closing their powerful pincer-like mandibles on enemies. Soldiers should not be confused with army ants.

=== Drones ===
Drones are winged males which are larger than workers and soldiers. They are the only male ants who inhabit the colony, and their sole purpose is to mate with a queen during her nuptial flight or at another time. Drones are fed by workers and do little or no work in the nest. Drones have a lifespan of only 1–2 weeks, much shorter than the queen's lifespan of up to 15 years and workers' lifespan of about 7 years. This is because drones are no longer needed after they mate with the queen.

=== Queens ===
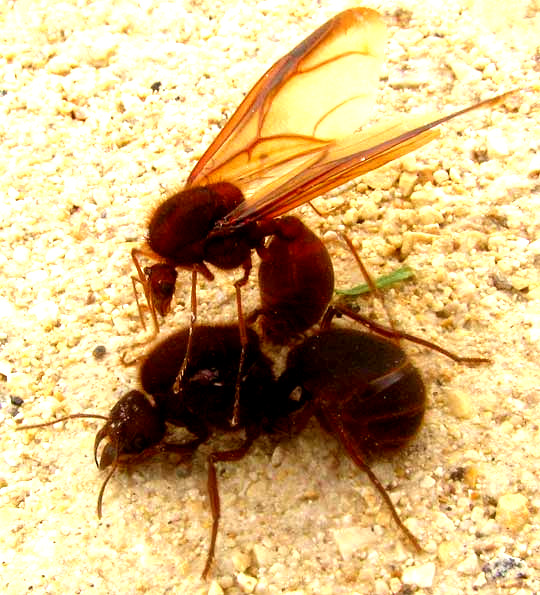
Texas leafcutter (Atta texana) drone mounting a queen. She has shed her wings after her nuptial flight.

The queen plays a major role in both creating new colonies and maintaining the population in established ones. When a queen is ready to mate, she leaves her colony of origin and flies into the air with many drones following her. One or more may mate with her, depending on the species and circumstances. Once the queen has mated, she finds somewhere to begin digging a nest. Inside her nest, she lays a few eggs. These will hatch into workers who will expand the nest. From there, she will continue to spawn workers and other queens. A typical queen lays more than 25,000 eggs per day and 150 million eggs over her lifetime.

== Fungus cultivation ==
Atta workers carry fresh plant material into their subterranean nests, where a specialized species of fungus, Leucocoprinus gongylophorus, grows on the plant material they bring. All the ants feed on this fungus. Larvae, pupae, and adults feed on liquids produced in the gongylidia, the bulbous tip structures of the fungus. The ants are completely dependent on the fungus and provide for all of its needs. Both gain from this mutualist relationship.

Before leaving their parent colonies, Atta queens store a small amount of fungus from their home colony in their infrabuccal or fungus pockets, a depression below the head. This fungus stays with the queen during her nuptial flight and while mating. After she loses her wings and digs a hole to begin her future colony, the queen uses the fungus she has brought with her to "seed" her underground space, fertilizing the fungus with her fecal matter. While waiting for the fungus to grow, she survives by burning body fat reserves, eating 90% of the eggs she lays, and using nutrients from the degeneration of her now unneeded wing muscles.

Workers also acquire water and nutrients from plant sap they ingest as they cut plant leaves.

== Behaviour ==
Worker ants often harvest leaf parts well away from their nest, despite the same plant species growing closer to their nest. It is also observed that a nest's workers may harvest leaf sections from a certain species for some time, then switch to another species. Studies suggest that many factors explain these behaviours, such as the ant's potential inability to see where the plants are.

Certain workers climb onto cut sections of leaf and ride the leaf back to the nest as another worker carries the leaf and its passenger. Such leaf riders protect the other workers from a particular species of phorid fly that parasitises the leaf-carriers. While hitchhiking, the ants riding the leaf also work to decontaminate the leaf fragment before it arrives at the nest. Ant communities that exhibit this complex division of labour among highly specialized forms are often regarded as superorganisms.

Atta ants avoid plant material containing chemical compounds which are fungicidal (dangerous for the fungus), repellent, and/or toxic.

If Atta ants become trapped in a collapsed tunnel, they make a tapping sound, and other ants will rescue them.

== Predators ==
Nomamyrmex esenbeckii is an army ant species known to prey on Atta colonies. Birds, bats, and ground mammals feed on Atta queens searching for a nest site after mating.

Armadillos are well adapted to feed on all ant species. Nine-banded armadillos often feed on Texas leafcutter ants.

== Evolution ==
The leafcutter ant genera Atta and Acromyrmex split from a common ancestor about 10 million years ago (Mya). The Trachymyrmex group and Sericomyrmex are the closest relatives to the leafcutters; they split off about 17 Mya.

Beginning around 50 Mya, the evolutionary history of various leafcutter ant taxa has been strongly affected by ants coevolving with their fungus. During this coevolution, the fungus lost its ability to produce spores, and the ants made it their main food source. Leafcutter ants are thought to have propagated the same fungal lineage for 25 million years, during which time the ants took over the fungus's reproduction process.

== Ecological effects ==
Atta ants are often considered ecosystem engineers, meaning that they create and modify habitats. They transfer organic matter underground, enhance soil aeration, and increase soil nutrient availability and nitrogen fixation rates.

A study found that emissions of carbon dioxide, or CO_{2}, over soil in which Atta nests were present were 15–60% more than over nearby soil with no Atta nests. At an ecosystem scale, this amounted to Atta nests adding 0.2 to 0.7% more CO_{2} to the atmosphere. The emitted CO_{2} was produced by the large amounts of decomposing plant material stored in the Atta's underground nests.

As human behavior and climate change increasingly fragment the tropical and subtropical parts of the Americas, Atta ants are becoming more abundant and their impact on soil carbon dynamics is expected to increase.

Atta ants can also create gaps in forests with an otherwise closed or unbroken canopy by trimming the leaves of plants in the understory; this allows more light to hit the forest floor. They can also alter the types of trees and other plants in their area by selectively bringing seeds into the underground chambers. If the chambers are not too deep, such seeds can send shoots upward, which reach light and grow into established plants.

== Interaction with humans ==
=== Defoliation of desired plants ===
Many people consider Atta ants to be major pests. They can completely defoliate a wide range of ornamental, garden, and agricultural plants. Because Atta ants only eat the fungus they cultivate, they may not be as affected as other ants by common insecticides.

=== As food ===
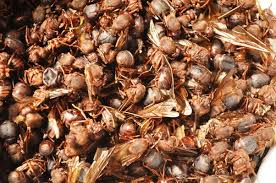
Atta winged males ("Chicatanas") for sale in Oaxaca, Mexico

Atta drones are a popular ingredient in Mexican cuisine, particularly in southern states such as Chiapas, Guerrero, Hidalgo, Puebla, Veracruz, and Oaxaca. They are considered a delicacy and are high in protein, so they are often served as a main dish. They may be eaten as the sole filling in tacos. A fan of chicatana dishes in Mexico describes them as "smoky and earthy, with a crunchy texture -- ahumado y terroso, con textura crujiente".

In Brazil, the flying adults of Atta ants (locally known as tanajuras) are highly appreciated as delicacies in several regions. The techniques involving their capture and cooking are considered a part of the cultural heritage of people of the Tianguá municipality in Ceará.

The native Guanes people of central Colombia first began cultivating and cooking the insects in the 7th century. They also used the ants' sharp pincers as stitches. The marauding Spanish conquistadors later adopted the habit.

=== Popular culture ===
Princess Atta from A Bug's Life was named after the leafcutter genus Atta.
In the novel Atta, a man is shrunk by a bolt of lightning and befriends an ant named Atta.

== Species ==
- Atta bisphaerica (Forel, 1908) - southeastern Brazil
- Atta capiguara (Gonçalves, 1944) - São Paulo (state), Brazil
- Atta cephalotes (Hairy-headed leafcutter ant) (Linnaeus, 1758) - central Mexico to central Brazil
- Atta colombica (Guérin-Méneville, 1844) - Costa Rica, Panama and Colombia
- Atta cubana (Fontenla Rizo, 1995) - Cuba
- Atta goiana (Gonçalves, 1942) - Brazil (Cerrado)
- Atta insularis (Guérin-Méneville, 1844) - Cuba
- Atta laevigata (F. Smith, 1858) - Colombia to Paraguay
- Atta mexicana (Smith, 1858) - Arizona and Texas (United States) to the southern Honduras
- Atta opaciceps (Borgmeier, 1939) - Brazil (Caatinga)
- Atta pilosa (Buckley, 1866) - Texas (United States)
- Atta robusta (Borgmeier, 1939) - coastal southeastern Brazil
- Atta saltensis (Forel, 1913) - southeastern Bolivia, northwestern Paraguay and northern Argentina
- Atta sexdens (Linnaeus, 1758) - Panama to northeastern Argentina
- Atta tardigrada (Buckley, 1866) - Texas (United States)
- Atta texana (Texas leafcutter ant) (Buckley, 1860) - eastern Texas and western Louisiana (United States) and northeastern Mexico
- Atta vollenweideri (Chaco leafcutter ant) (Forel, 1893) - Gran Chaco

== See also ==
- List of leafcutter ants
