= Queen ant =

Adult reproducing ant in an ant colony

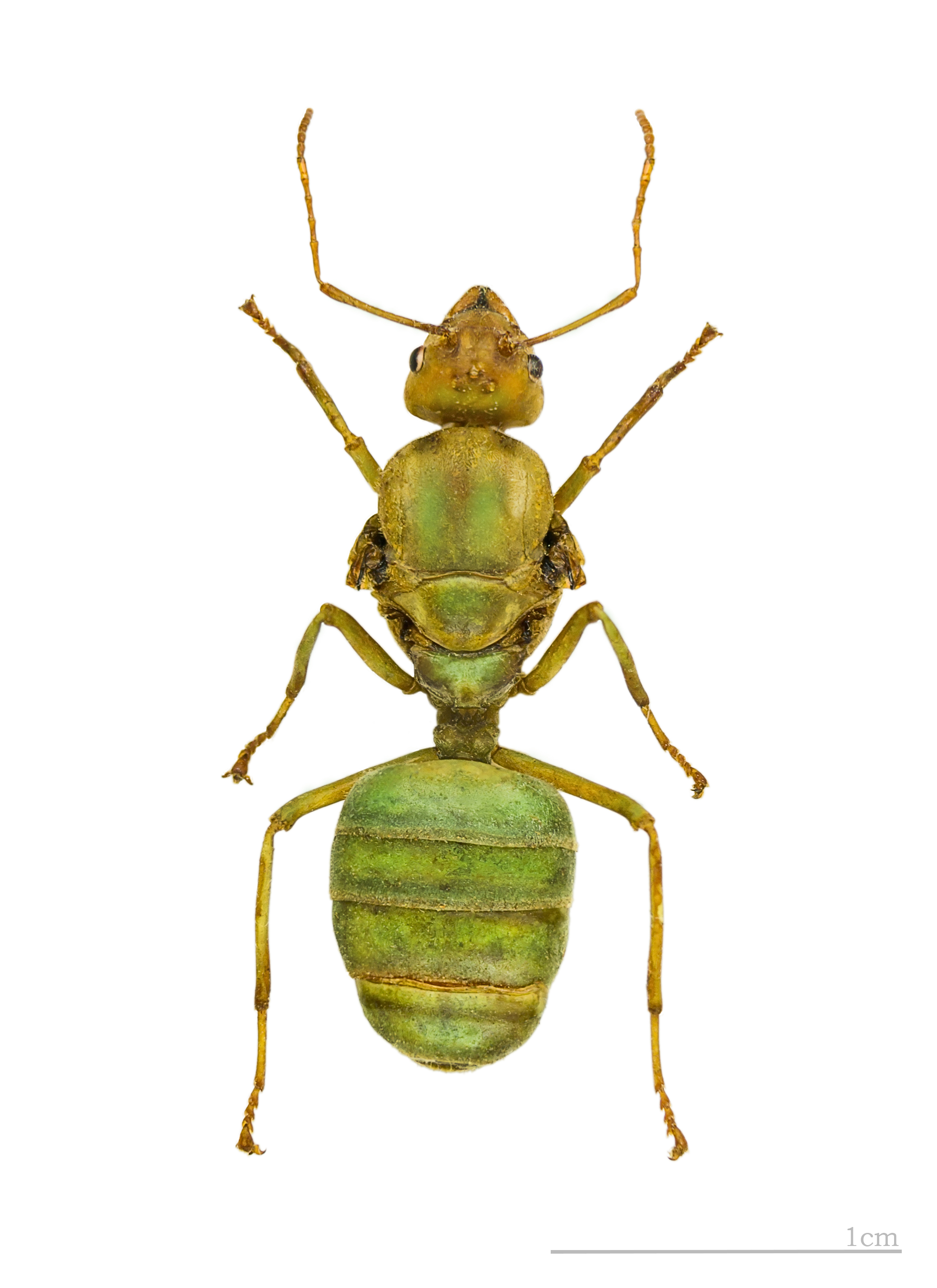
Oecophylla smaragdina queen that has shed its wings

Young Odontomachus brunneus queen with her first few workers in a test tube setup.

A queen ant (also known as a gyne) is an adult, reproducing female ant in an ant colony; she is usually the mother of all the other ants in that colony. Some female ants, such as the Cataglyphis, do not need to mate to produce offspring, reproducing through asexual parthenogenesis or cloning, and all of those offspring will be female. Others, like those in the genus Crematogaster, mate in a nuptial flight. Queen offspring ants among most species develop from larvae specially fed in order to become sexually mature.

Depending on the species, there can be either a single mother queen, or potentially hundreds of fertile queens. Not every colony of ants has a queen. Some colonies have multiple queens.

Queen ants are the only members of a colony to lay eggs. After mating, they can produce thousands, sometimes millions, of eggs during their lifetime. A queen of Lasius niger was held in captivity by German entomologist Hermann Appel for 28 3/4 years; also a Pogonomyrmex owyheei has maximum estimated longevity of thirty years in the field.

== Life cycle ==
=== Development ===
Ants go through four stages of development: egg, larva, pupa (sometimes cocoon, called metamorphosis depending on the species) and adult. The larvae have no legs but are capable of some minor movement, such as bending their head toward a food source when fed. During this stage, the level of care and nourishment the larvae receive determines their eventual adult form. When resources are low, all larvae will develop into female worker ants; however, if the parent of a sexually reproducing colony has a plentiful supply of food, some of the larvae will receive better nourishment than others, and develop into winged, sexually mature female ants destined to leave the colony. At this stage, the winged female ants are sometimes known as "princess ants".

=== Early life ===
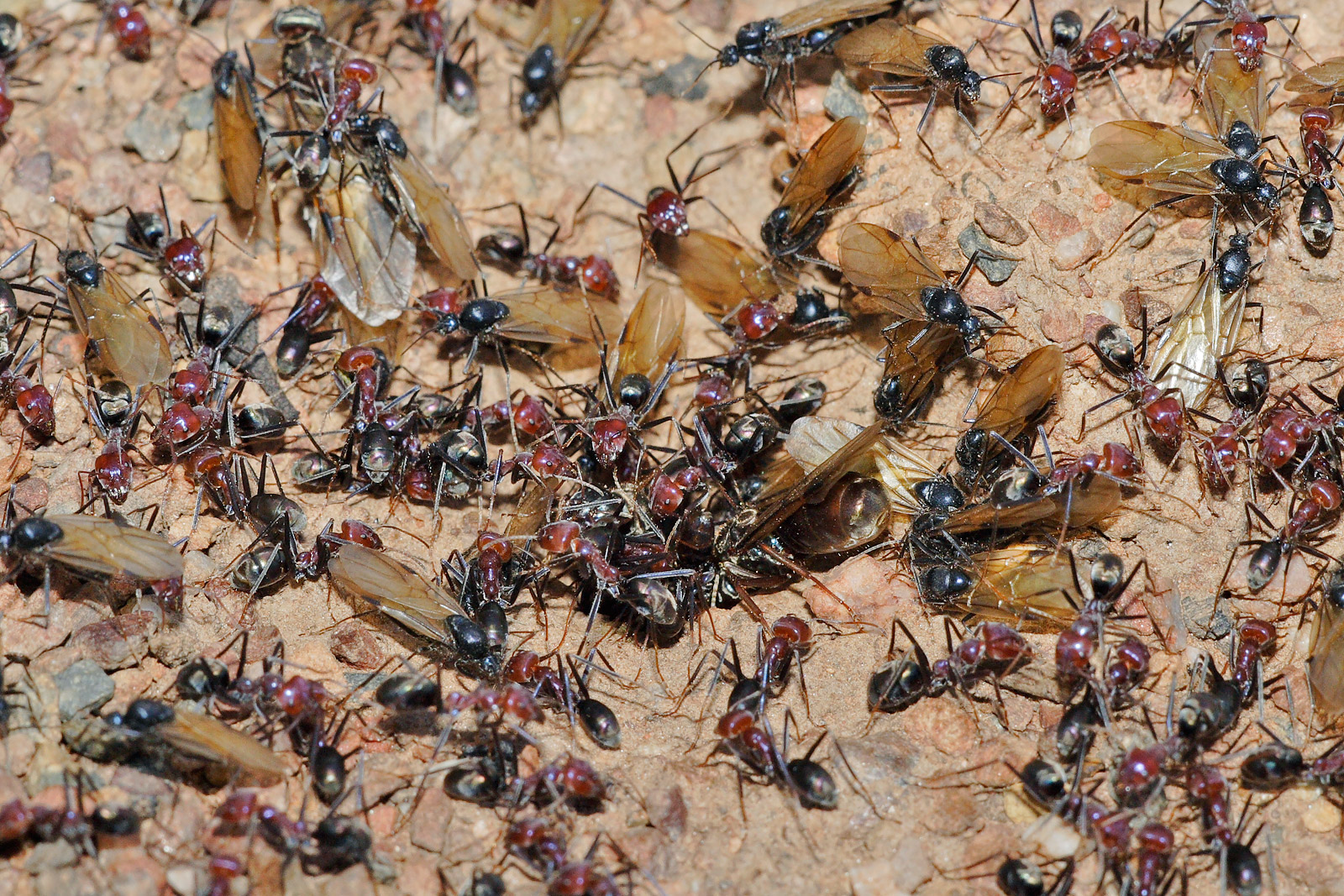
Winged ants (Iridomyrmex purpureus) swarming from the nest in preparation for the nuptial flight

When conditions are hot and humid after rain and there is minimal wind, masses of winged sexually reproducing ants or "flying ants" will leave their parent nest and take flight. The mating flights occur simultaneously in all ant nests of the particular species. The female "queen" ants will fly a long distance, during which they will mate with at least one winged male from another nest. He transfers sperm to the seminal receptacle of the queen and then dies. Once mated, the "queen" will attempt to find a suitable area to start a colony and, once found, will detach her wings.

=== An established colony ===
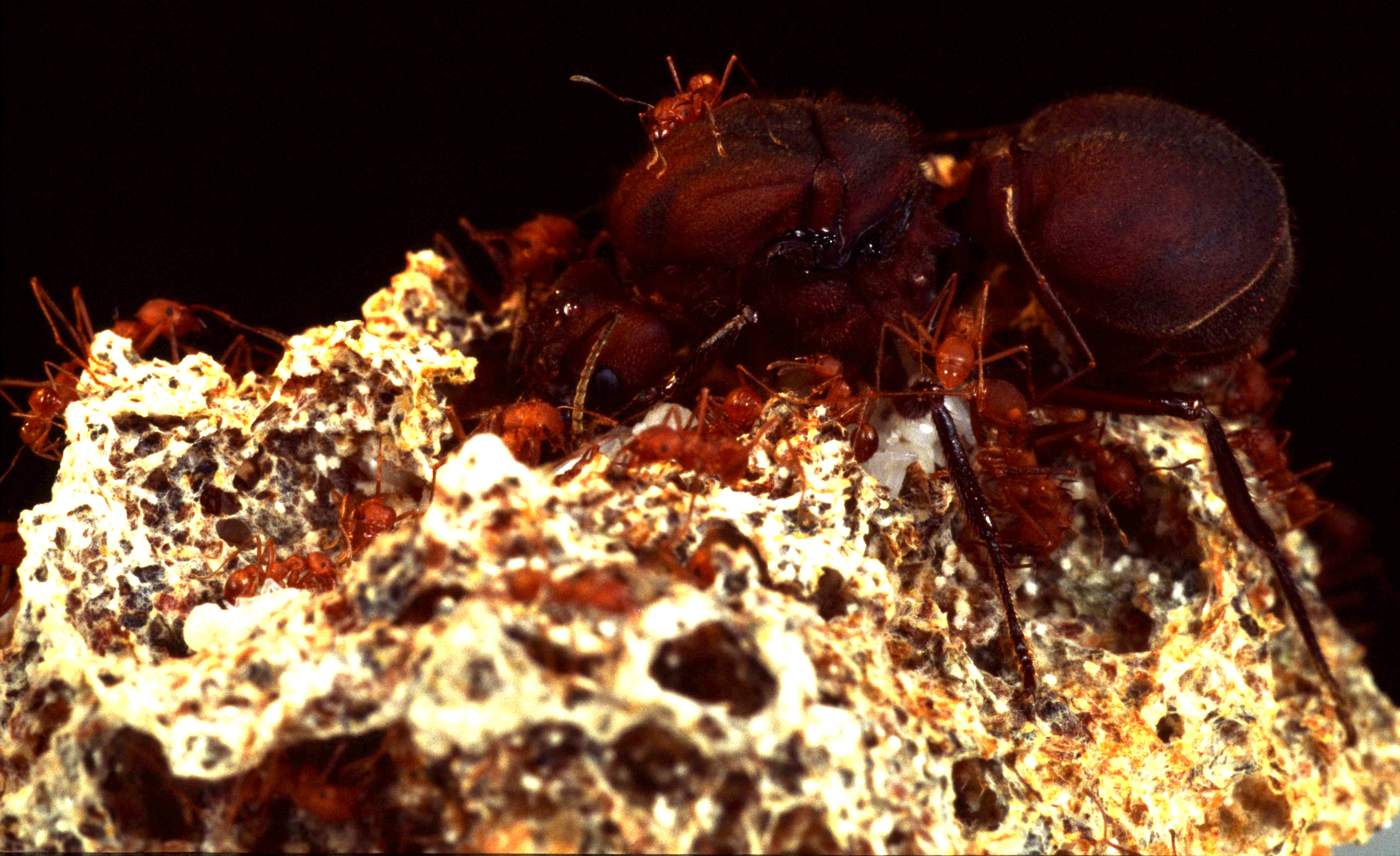
Leafcutter ant (Atta colombica) queen with workers and larvae on fungus that they cultivate.

Once a colony is established, the worker ants meet the queen's needs such as giving her food and disposing of her waste. Because ant social structure is very complex and individual ants are relatively simple, an ant colony can be thought of as a single organism, and the individual ants as cells or limbs of the organism, as the individuals can rarely survive on their own. In a colony, some ants may be unrelated to the queen(s), such as when a brood is captured in a raid and raised as the colony's own.

=== Reproduction ===
Once the colony has established itself, the queen ant will lay eggs continuously. Among species that reproduce sexually, the queen selectively uses the sperm cells retained from the nuptial flight, laying fertilized or unfertilized eggs depending upon the cyclic needs of the colony; the sex of each individual ant is determined by whether or not the egg is fertilized. The fertilized eggs become female worker ants and unfertilized eggs develop as males; if the fertilized eggs and pupae are well-nurtured, they potentially become queens.

This system of sex determination, haplodiploidy, is generally true for all Hymenoptera – ants, bees, and wasps. However, a few ant species do not reproduce sexually, and members of these clonal colonies are all female.

=== Long-lived queens ===
The patterns of expression of genes involved in repair of DNA damage or protein damage were compared between age-matched queens and workers of the ant Lasius niger. The expression of these genes increased with age, and at age two months this increase, in both the legs and brain, was significantly greater in queens than in workers. This difference in repair gene expression between queens and workers suggests that the greater longevity of L. niger queens is due, in part, to increased investment in DNA and protein repair.

== See also ==
- Ergatoid
- Queen bee
