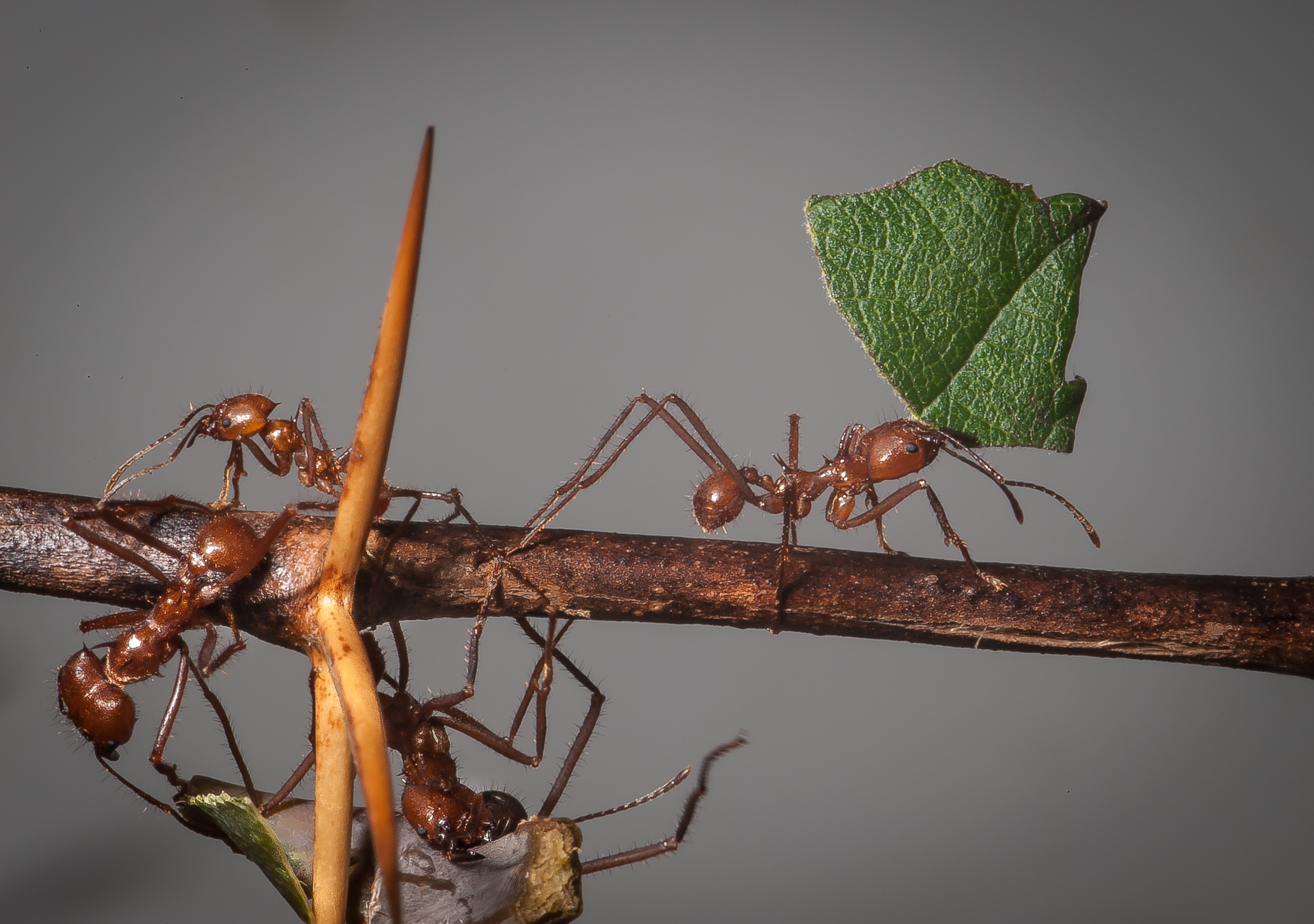
- Atta cephalotes worker carrying leaf segment

Scientific classification
- Kingdom: Animalia
- Phylum: Arthropoda
- Clade: Pancrustacea
- Class: Insecta
- Order: Hymenoptera
- Family: Formicidae
- Subfamily: Myrmicinae
- Genus: Atta
- Species: A. cephalotes

Binomial name
- Atta cephalotes (Linnaeus, 1758)

Synonyms
- Atta cephalotes integrior Forel, 1904; Atta cephalotes isthmicola Weber, 1941; Atta cephalotes oaxaquensis Gonçalves, 1942; Atta cephalotes opaca Forel, 1904; Atta cephalotes polita Emery, 1905; Atta lutea Forel, 1893; Formica fervens Drury, 1782; Formica grossa Fabricius, 1787; Formica migratoria De Geer, 1773; Formica visitatrix Christ, 1791

= Atta cephalotes =

Species of ant

Atta cephalotes, commonly known as the hairy-headed leafcutter ant, is a species of leafcutter ant in the tribe Attini (fungus-growing ants). A colony can contain up to 5 million members, and each colony has a single queen that can live more than 20 years. The colony comprises different castes, known as "task partitioning", and each caste has a different job to do. This caste system includes minims, medias and majors.

== Taxonomy ==
The species is one of the earliest formally classified ants, first described by Swedish zoologist Carl Linnaeus in 1758. It was originally described as Formica cephalotes in his book the 10th edition of Systema Naturae, along with 16 other ant species, all placed within the genus Formica. It was later transferred to a new genus, Atta, along with five other species by Danish zoologist Johan Christian Fabricius in 1804. In 1911, American entomologist William Morton Wheeler designated A. cephalotes as the type species of Atta. It was also designated as the type species of Oecodoma, but the genus is now a synonym of Atta.

== Biology and behaviour ==
The elder workers manage the colony's rubbish dump. These ants are excluded from the rest of the colony. If any wander outside the dump, the other ants will kill them or force them back. Rubbish workers are often contaminated with disease and toxins, and live only half as long as their peers. Ants lay pheromone trails as a method of communication to guide other ants to a discovered food source when returning to the nest. Minims work in the nest, digging, tending fungi and taking care of brood. Additionally they can ride the backs of the larger caste members for transport or, more importantly, defending ants encumbered by leaves from parasitic insects such as phorid flies which will lay eggs in the heads of leafcutter ants. The media act as harvesters. They bring leaves back to the nest for fungus cultivation. Lastly the majors almost exclusively perform defensive tasks guarding harvesting trails from other insects.

== Distribution and habitat ==
The species is widely distributed in the Neotropical region, from Mexico to Bolivia, with disjunct populations in Amazonas and north-eastern Brazil.

Across the rainforest floor they typically occupy an area of approximately 200 square meters. They live in nests that can be as deep as 7 metres that they have carefully positioned so that a breeze can rid the nest of the dangerous levels of CO_{2} given off by the fungus they farm and eat.
