= Nuptial flight =

Mating flight of eusocial insects

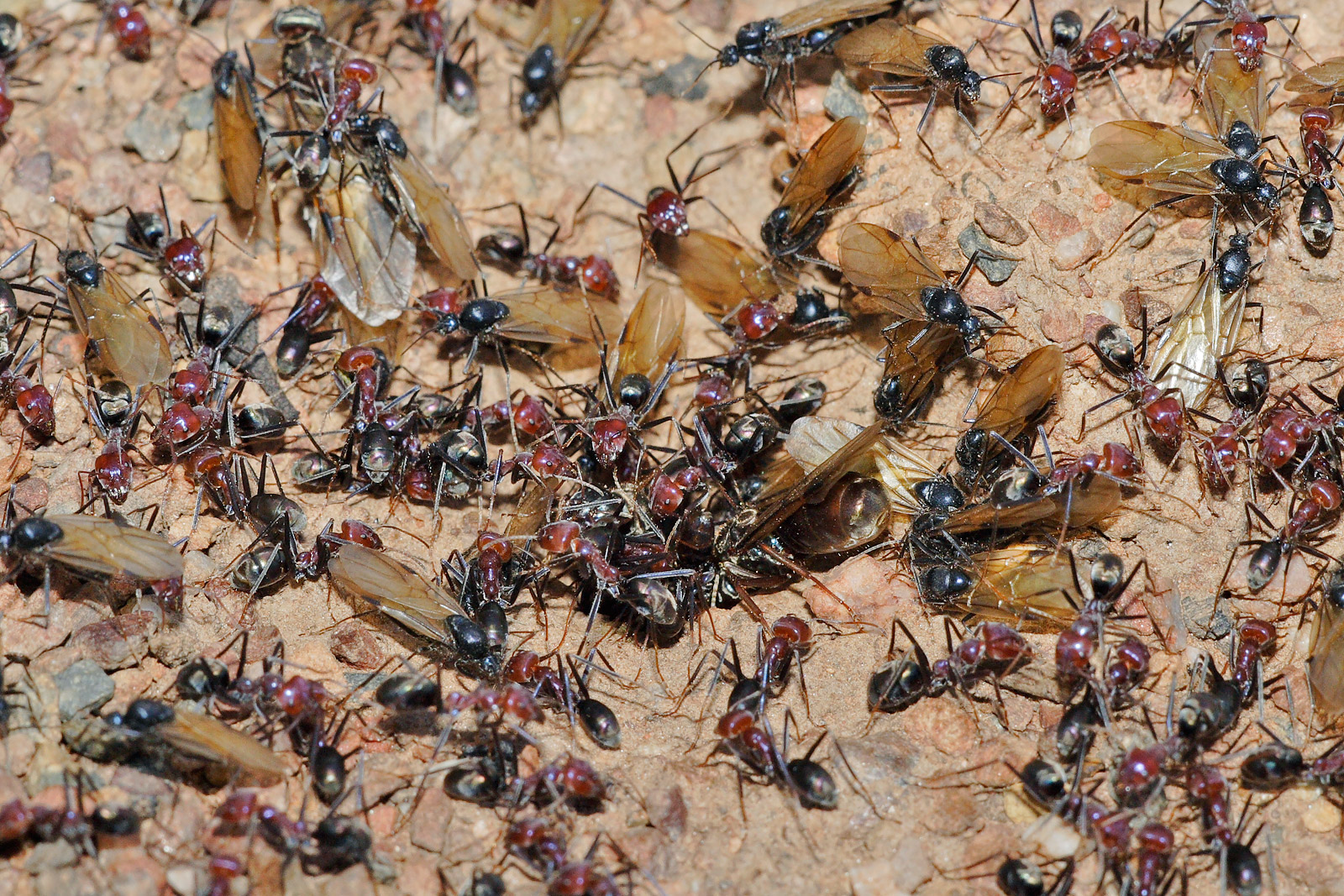
Meat ant nest swarming

Winged ants in Finland

Nuptial flight is a phase in the reproduction of most ant, termite, and some bee species. It is also observed in some fly species, such as Rhamphomyia longicauda.

During the flight, virgin queens mate with males and then land to start a new colony, or, in the case of honey bees, continue the succession of an existing hived colony.

The winged version of ants and termites are known as alates.

== Before the flight ==
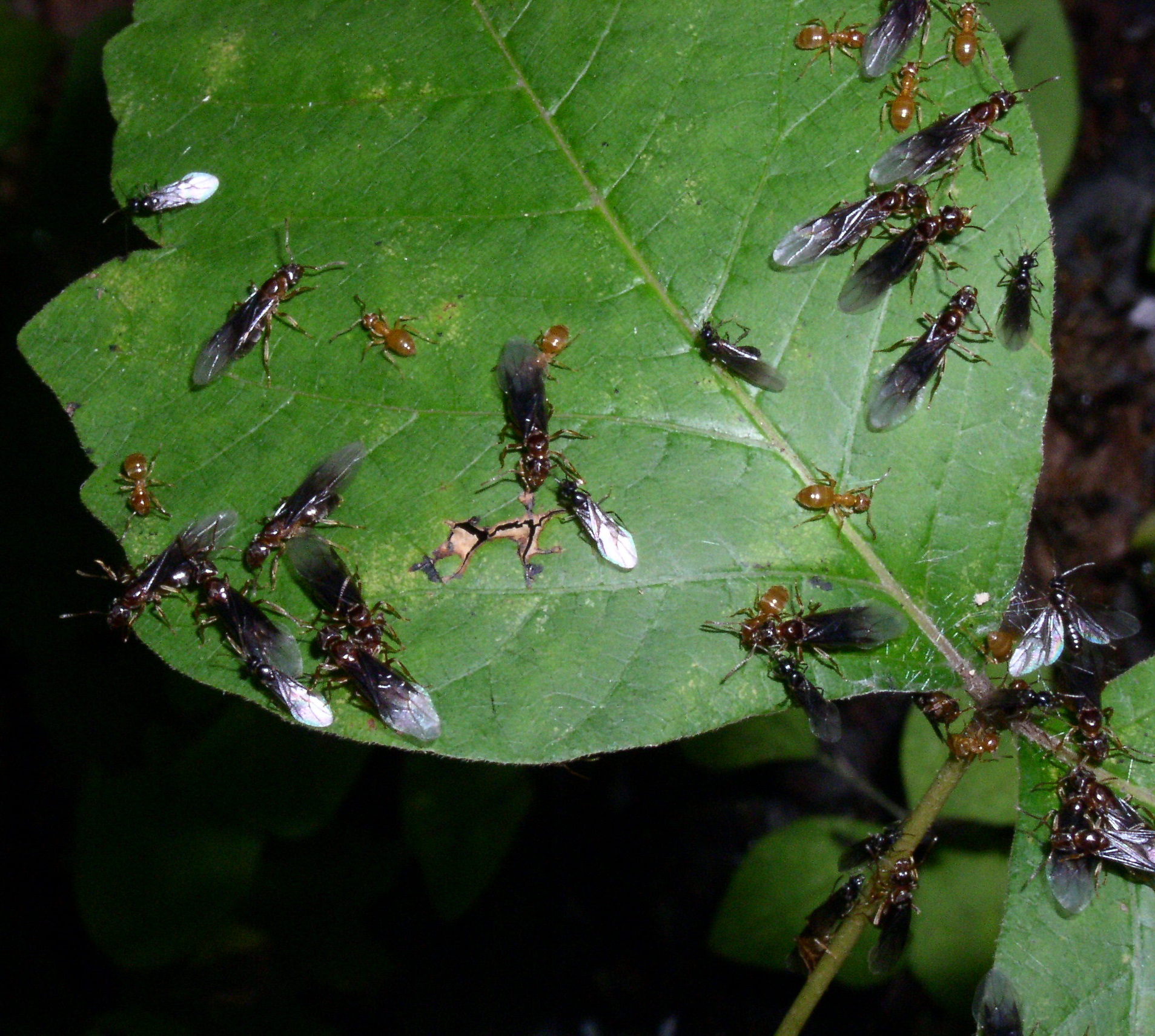
Male and female Lasius umbratus preparing for their nuptial flight

A mature ant colony seasonally produces winged virgin queens and males, called alates. Unfertilized eggs develop into males. Fertilized eggs usually develop into wingless, sterile workers, but may develop into virgin queens if the larvae receive special attention.

Within a few days after they have emerged (eclosed) from the pupa case, males are "quickly converted into single-purpose sexual missiles". Young queens and males stay in their parent colony until conditions are right for the nuptial flight. The flight requires clear weather since rain is disruptive for flying insects. Different colonies of the same species often use environmental cues to synchronize the release of males and queens so that they can mate with individuals from other nests, thus reducing inbreeding. The actual "take off" from the parent colony is also often synchronized to overwhelm their predators.

== During the flight ==
Typically the virgin queens and males first scatter to ensure outcrossing. The queens then release pheromones to attract males. However, the queens often try to escape the males, allowing only the fastest and the fittest males to mate. Mating takes place during flight.

One queen usually mates with several males. The sperm is stored in a special organ, known as a spermatheca, in the queen's abdomen, and lasts throughout her lifetime. This can be as long as 20 years, during which time the sperm can be used to fertilize tens of millions of eggs.

== After the flight ==
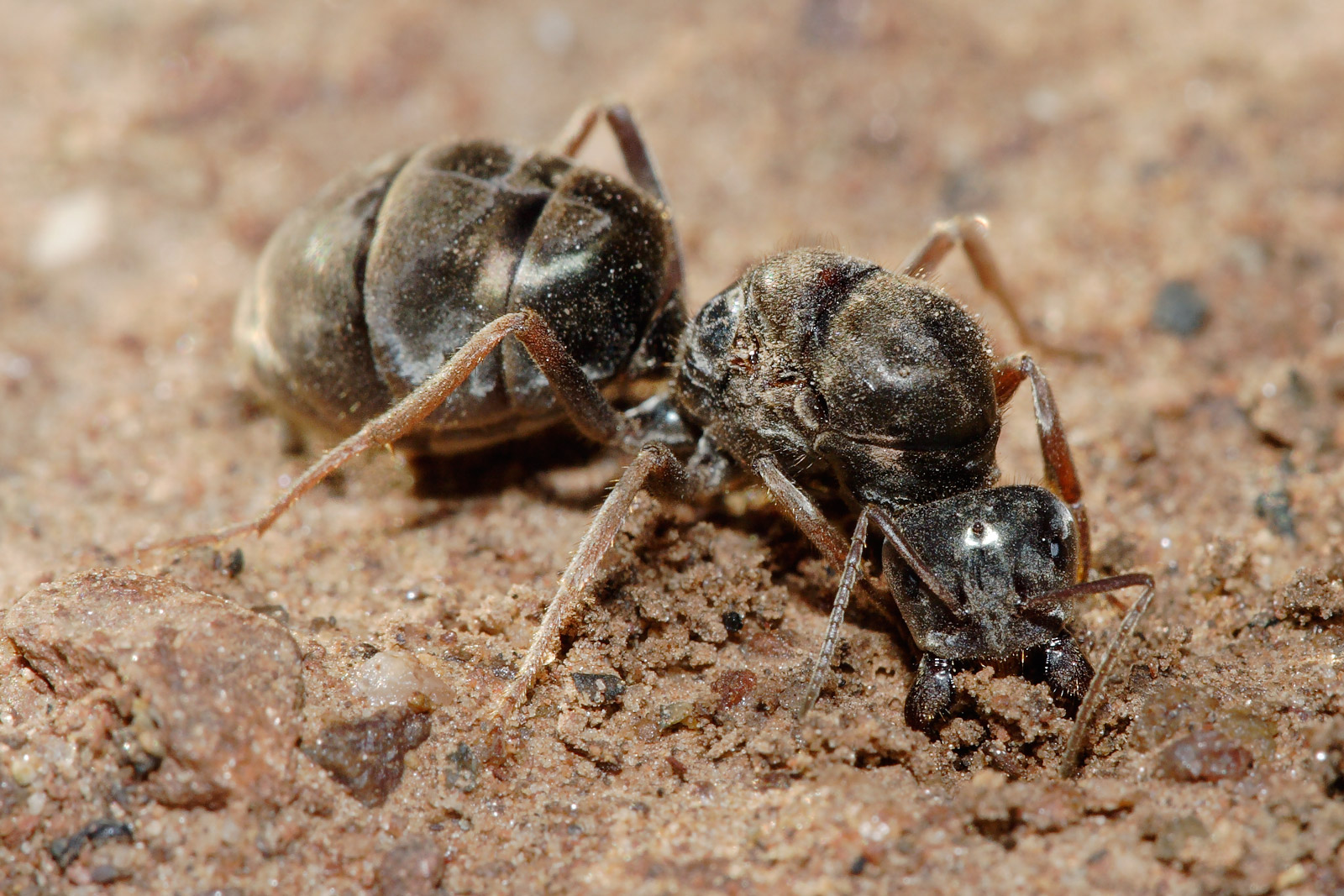
Young queen beginning to dig a new colony

The males have evolved for the single purpose of inseminating the queen. During "the quick and violent mating," the male places his internal genitalia into the genital chamber of the queen and quickly dies.

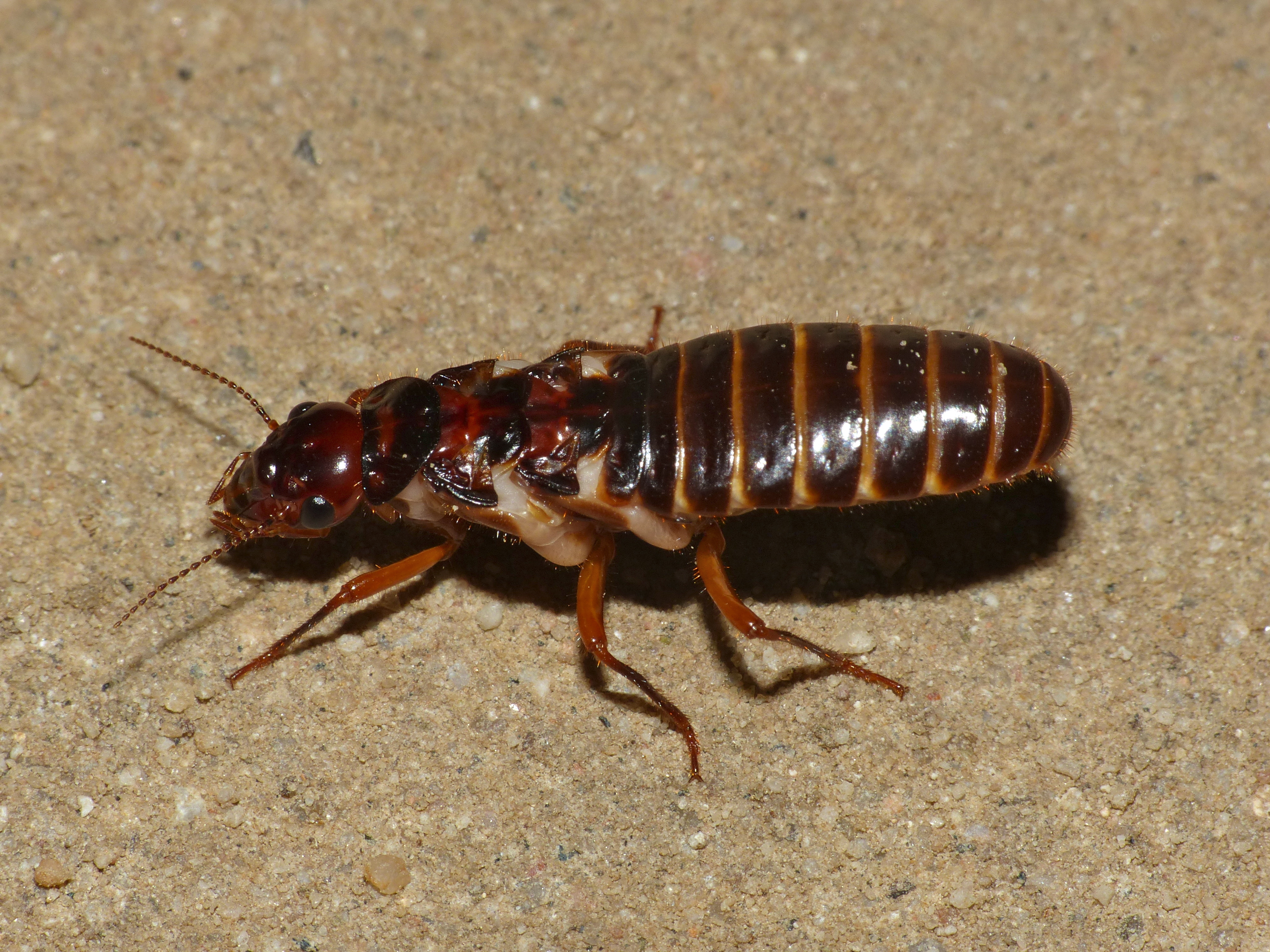
After shedding its wings, a termite reproductive retains the stubs where they snapped off at the line of weakness.

The young mated queens land and, in the case of most ants and all termites, remove their wings. They then attempt to found a new colony. The details of this vary from species to species, but typically involve the excavation of the colony's first chamber and the subsequent laying of eggs. From this point the queen continuously lays eggs which hatch into larvae, exclusively destined to develop into worker ants. The queen usually nurses the first brood alone. After the first workers appear, the queen's role in the colony typically becomes one of exclusive (and generally continuous) egg-laying. For an example of a colony founding process, see Atta sexdens.

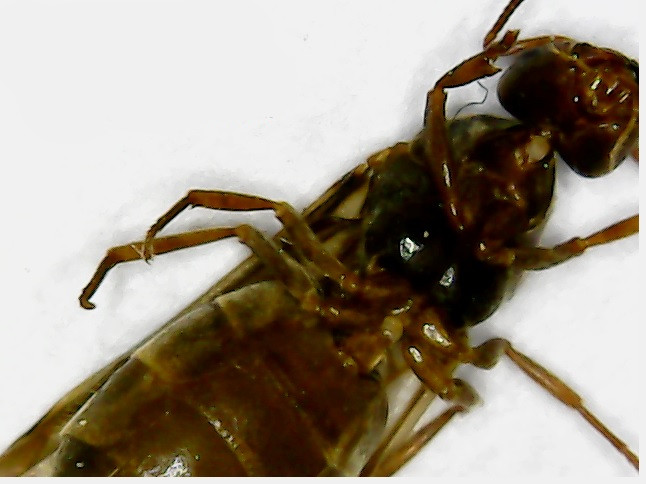
Flying Ant from Calgary, Alberta Canada Aug 2018

The young queens have an extremely high failure rate. During its lifetime a very large ant colony can send out millions of virgin queens. Assuming that the total number of ant colonies in the area remains constant, on average only one of these queens succeeds. The rest are destroyed by predators (most notably other ants), environmental hazards or failures in raising the first brood at various stages of the process. This strict selection ensures that the queen has to be both extremely fit and extremely lucky to pass on her genes to the next generation.

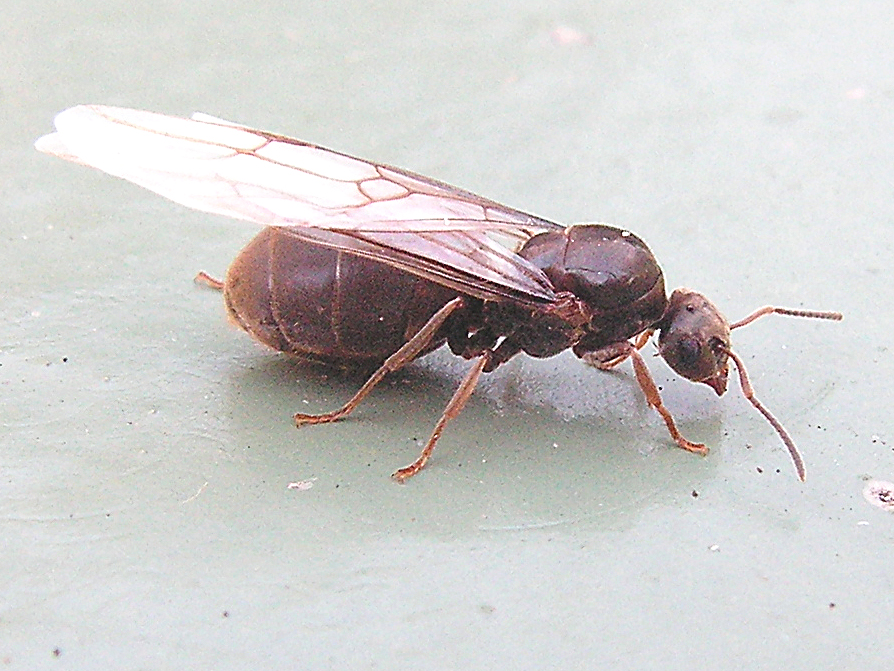
Queen with wings

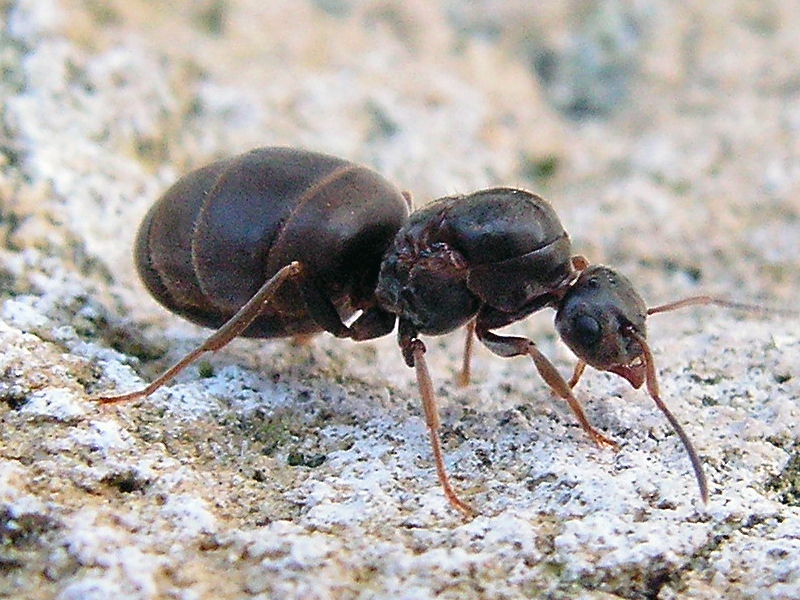
Queen with her wings torn off

== Variations ==
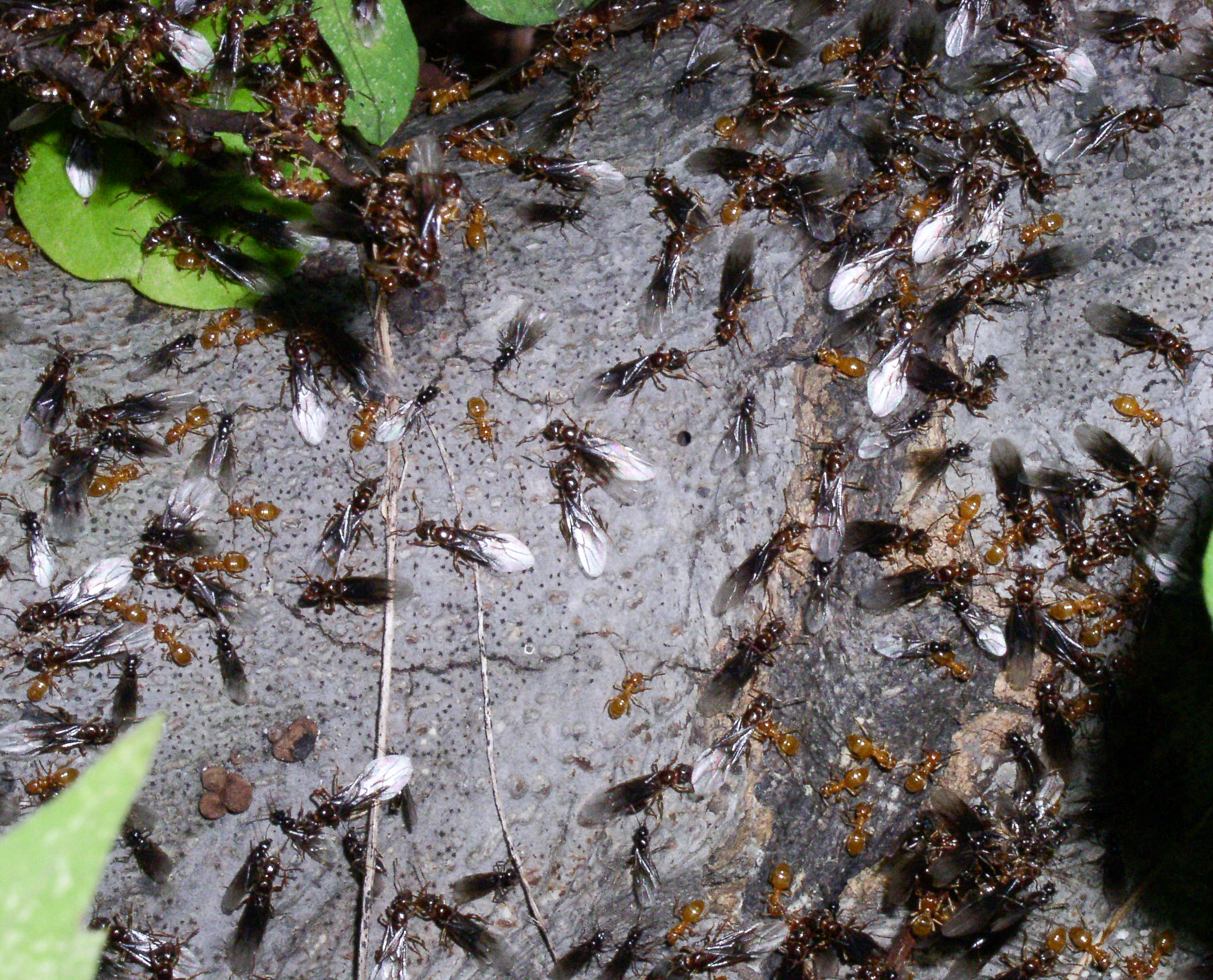
Lasius umbratus

Not all ants follow the basic pattern described above. In army ants only males are alates, having wings. They fly out from their parent colony in search of other colonies where wingless virgin queens wait for them. A colony with an old queen and one or more mated young queens then divides, each successful queen taking a share of the workers. The reason for this behavior is the fact that army ants do not have a physical nest. The queens are thus absolutely dependent on workers to protect them.

Another variation is found in species with multi-queen colonies, such as Solenopsis invicta. The males and virgin queens mate and the queens then often return to the parent colony, where they then remain. This process greatly increases the success rate of virgin queens and allows the creation of extremely large supercolonies. The colony also becomes essentially immortal as it is no longer dependent on the continued health of a single queen. This allows Solenopsis invicta colonies to become entrenched in their surroundings, achieving a dominant position in the ecosystem. However, the price for this is inbreeding and the resulting loss of adaptability. This may result in sudden collapses in population when the environment changes or a new predator or parasite is introduced.

== Flying ant day ==
"Flying ant day" is an informal term for the day on which future queen ants emerge from the nest to begin their nuptial flight, although citizen science based research has demonstrated that nuptials flights are not particularly spatially or temporally synchronised. However, the number of ants flying on certain days can be large enough to be detected by weather service radar systems, resembling rain showers.

In most species, the male ants fly alongside them, although they are smaller and less noticeable. The queens fly around – some covering very long distances, others only a few meters – then mate and drop to the ground, where they lose their wings and attempt to start a new ant colony. The mass of flying insects often attracts the attention of predators such as birds, and it is common to see flocks gorging on the readily available food.

This phenomenon occurs in many colonies simultaneously when local weather conditions are appropriate, to reduce the effectiveness of predation, and to ensure that the queens and males from different colonies stand a chance of meeting and interbreeding. It therefore has the appearance of being a 'timed' event or that the ants somehow communicate. However neither of these is likely to be the case – it could be simply a common response to temperature, humidity and wind speed and time of year.

== See also ==
- Honey bee life cycle
- Queen bee
- Queen ant
