= Wildlife of Tunisia =

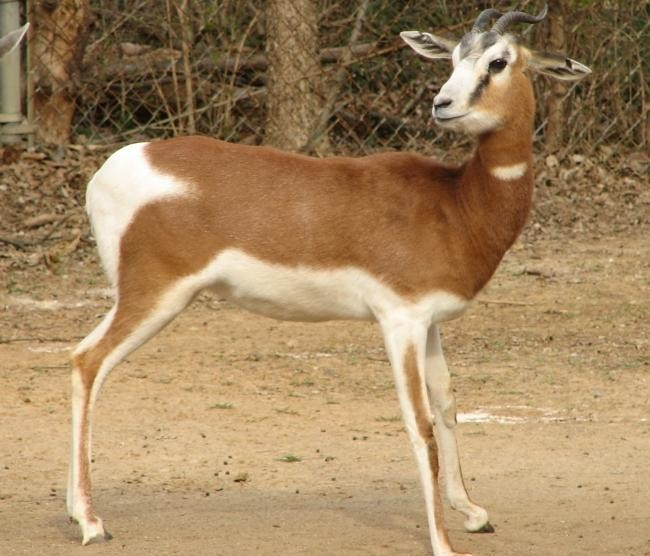
Dama gazelle

The wildlife of Tunisia is composed of its flora and fauna. It has 84 species of mammals and 375 species of birds. Tunisia is well documented for its addax and dama gazelle population.

== Fauna ==
The fauna of Tunisia includes the following:

Spiders:

- Zodarion pusio

Insects:

- Agabus africanus
- Agabus ramblae
- Ameles assoi
- Ameles dumonti
- Bothriomyrmex breviceps
- Bothriomyrmex cuculus
- Bothriomyrmex decapitans
- Bothriomyrmex emarginatus
- Bothriomyrmex pubens
- Bothriomyrmex regicidus
- Cataglyphis fortis
- Cataglyphis hannae
- Moitrelia boeticella

== Mammals ==
Of the mammal species in Tunisia, three are critically endangered, three are endangered, nine are vulnerable, and two are near threatened. One of the species listed for Tunisia can no longer be found in the wild.

== Birds ==
The avifauna of Tunisia include a total of 421 species.
