= Gaster (insect anatomy) =

Bulbous posterior portion of the metasoma

In the worker ant the metasoma is divided into the narrow petiole and bulbous gaster. The abdomen technically includes the metasoma and the propodeum which is fused to the thorax.

The gaster (from Ancient Greek γαστήρ 'belly, paunch') is the bulbous posterior portion of the metasoma found in hymenopterans of the suborder Apocrita (bees, wasps and ants). This begins with abdominal segment III on most ants, but some make a constricted postpetiole out of segment III, in which case the gaster begins with abdominal segment IV.

The gaster in ants contains what is sometimes called the "social stomach," which is named for the fact that food can be carried within it and then shared with other members of the colony. It also contains the ant's heart as well as the rest of their digestive system.

In the ant subfamily Formicinae, the gaster houses an acidiphore which they can use to spray formic acid.

Certain ants in the genus Cataglyphis, including Cataglyphis bicolor and Cataglyphis fortis, have a cubiform petiole that allows them to decrease their moment of inertia by raising their gaster into an upright position. This lets them move more quickly on their sinusoidal foraging paths and evade predators by moving more erratically.

The ant species Cephalotes atratus is capable of gliding by changing the angle of their gaster as they fall.

== Parasitism ==
In ants, the gaster is the site for certain endoparasites including several species of the nematode families mermithidae and tetradonematidae. Certain mermithidaen that inhabit ant hosts only inhabit a single species or genus while others also target insects other than ants. These endoparasites have been parasitizing ants for 20–30 million years, as seen in amber from the Dominican Republic. Infection by a mermithidean nematode is evidenced by a swelling of the gaster as the young nematode develops. Eventually the endoparasite forces its host to water where it then exits, killing its host. Only two tetradonematidae nematodes have been noted to use ants as a host. These endoparasites spend their entire life cycle within a host. Myrmeconema neotropicum is particularly notable for altering the color of their host's gaster to be bright red.

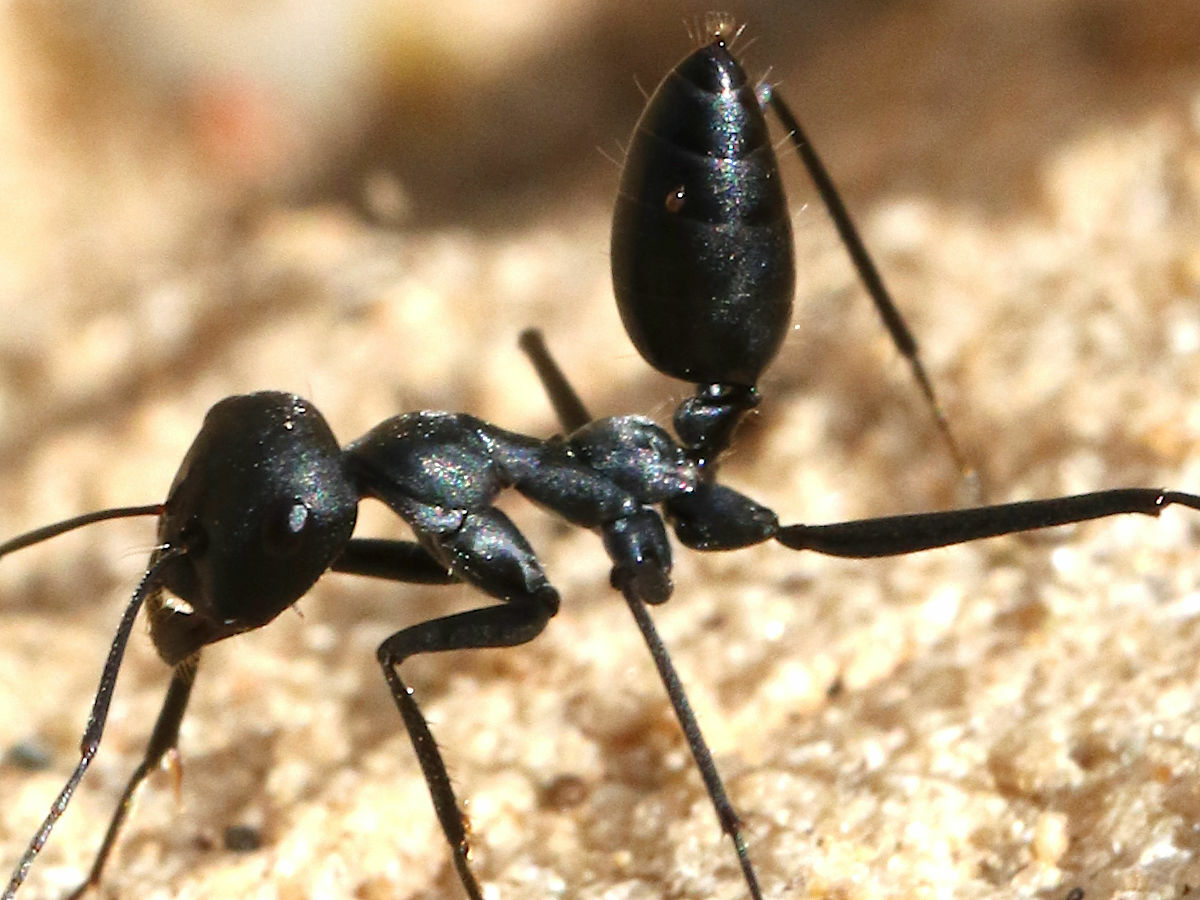
Cataglyphis nigra with raised gaster
