= Crematogaster ambigua =

Scientific classification
- Domain: Eukaryota
- Kingdom: Animalia
- Phylum: Arthropoda
- Class: Insecta
- Order: Hymenoptera
- Family: Formicidae
- Subfamily: Myrmicinae
- Genus: Crematogaster
- Species: C. ambigua

Binomial name
- Crematogaster ambigua Santschi, 1926

Species of ant

Crematogaster ambigua is a species of ant in tribe Crematogastrini. It was described by Santschi in 1926.
