= Crematogaster corporaali =

Scientific classification
- Domain: Eukaryota
- Kingdom: Animalia
- Phylum: Arthropoda
- Class: Insecta
- Order: Hymenoptera
- Family: Formicidae
- Subfamily: Myrmicinae
- Genus: Crematogaster
- Species: C. corporaali

Binomial name
- Crematogaster corporaali Santschi, 1928

Species of ant

Crematogaster corporaali is a species of ant in tribe Crematogastrini. It was described by Santschi in 1928.
