= Crematogaster angusticeps =

Scientific classification
- Domain: Eukaryota
- Kingdom: Animalia
- Phylum: Arthropoda
- Class: Insecta
- Order: Hymenoptera
- Family: Formicidae
- Subfamily: Myrmicinae
- Genus: Crematogaster
- Species: C. angusticeps

Binomial name
- Crematogaster angusticeps Santschi, 1911

Species of ant

Crematogaster angusticeps is a species of ant in tribe Crematogastrini. It was described by Santschi in 1911.
