= Crematogaster amabilis =

Scientific classification
- Domain: Eukaryota
- Kingdom: Animalia
- Phylum: Arthropoda
- Class: Insecta
- Order: Hymenoptera
- Family: Formicidae
- Subfamily: Myrmicinae
- Genus: Crematogaster
- Species: C. amabilis

Binomial name
- Crematogaster amabilis Santschi, 1911

Species of ant

Crematogaster amabilis is a species of ant in tribe Crematogastrini. It was described by Santschi in 1911.
