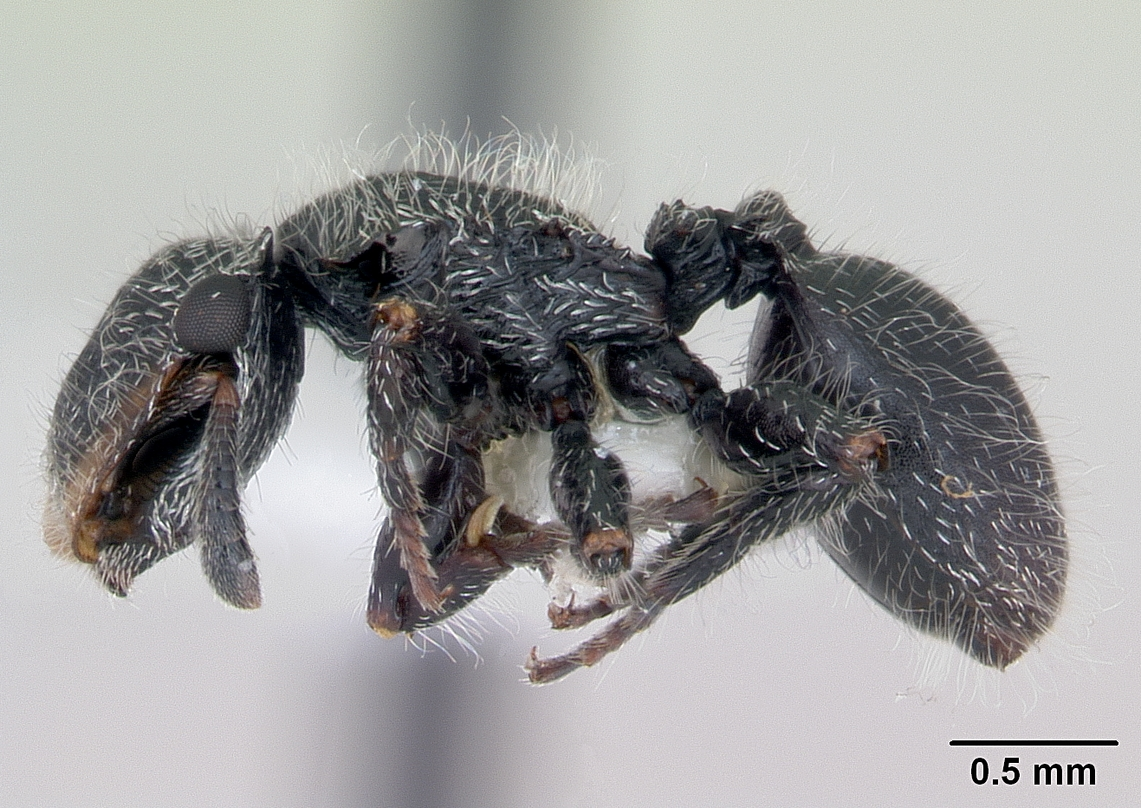
- Cephalotes lanuginosus worker

Scientific classification
- Domain: Eukaryota
- Kingdom: Animalia
- Phylum: Arthropoda
- Class: Insecta
- Order: Hymenoptera
- Family: Formicidae
- Subfamily: Myrmicinae
- Genus: Cephalotes
- Species: C. lanuginosus

Binomial name
- Cephalotes lanuginosus Santschi, 1919

= Cephalotes lanuginosus =

Species of ant

Cephalotes lanuginosus is a species of arboreal ant of the genus Cephalotes, characterized by an odd shaped head and the ability to "parachute" by steering their fall if they drop off of the tree they're on. Giving their name also as gliding ants. The species is native of Paraguay and the north of Argentina. Their larger and flatter legs, a trait common with other members of the genus Cephalotes, gives them their gliding abilities.

The species was first given a description and a classification in 1919 by Swiss entomologist Felix Santschi.
