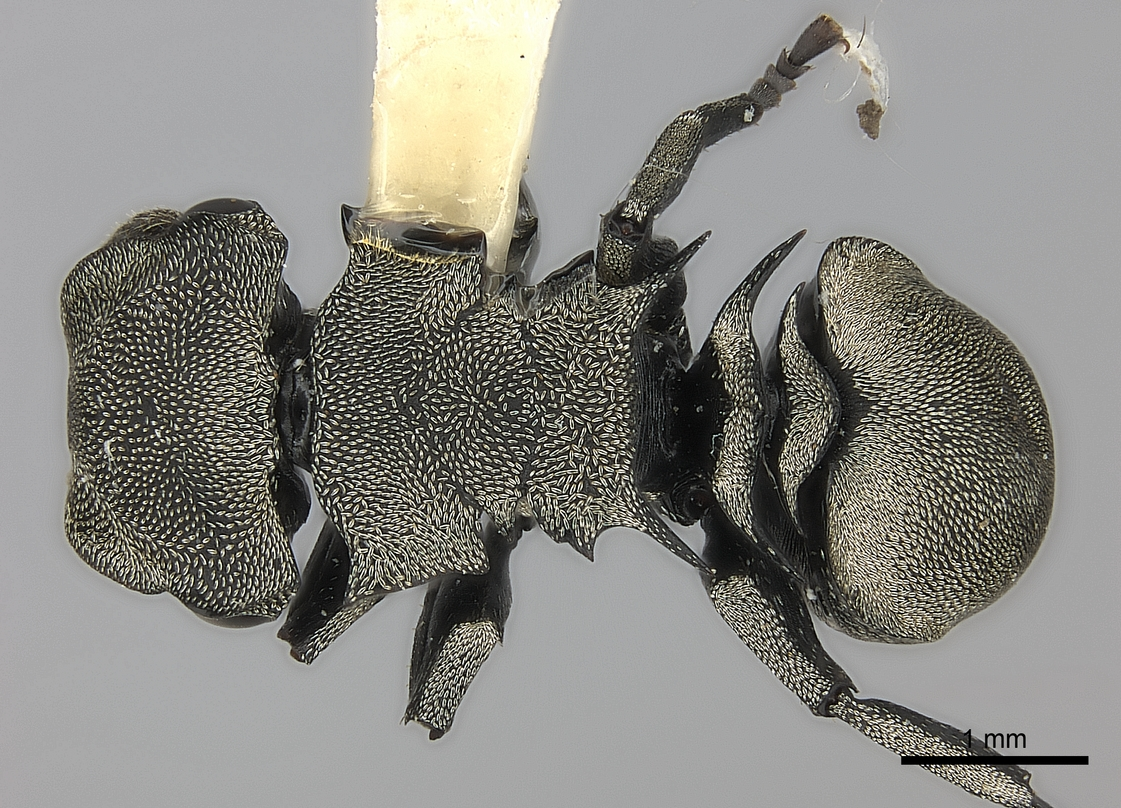

Scientific classification
- Domain: Eukaryota
- Kingdom: Animalia
- Phylum: Arthropoda
- Class: Insecta
- Order: Hymenoptera
- Family: Formicidae
- Subfamily: Myrmicinae
- Genus: Cephalotes
- Species: C. inca

Binomial name
- Cephalotes inca Santschi, 1911

= Cephalotes inca =

Species of ant

Cephalotes inca is a species of arboreal ant of the genus Cephalotes, characterized by an odd shaped head and the ability to "parachute" by steering their fall if they drop off of the tree they are on. They are also known as gliding ants. The species is native to Ecuador and Peru. Their larger and flatter legs, a trait common with other members of the genus Cephalotes, gives them their gliding abilities.

The species was first given a description and a classification in 1911 by Swiss entomologist Felix Santschi.
