= Bothriomyrmex communistus =

Scientific classification
- Domain: Eukaryota
- Kingdom: Animalia
- Phylum: Arthropoda
- Class: Insecta
- Order: Hymenoptera
- Family: Formicidae
- Subfamily: Dolichoderinae
- Genus: Bothriomyrmex
- Species: B. communistus

Binomial name
- Bothriomyrmex communistus Santschi, 1919

Subspecies
- Bothriomyrmex communista anatolicus Emery, 1925

Synonyms
- Bothriomyrmex meridionalis adriaca Santschi, 1922; Bothriomyrmex adriacus ionius Emery, 1925; Bothriomyrmex corsicus mohelensis Novak, 1941

Species of ant

Bothriomyrmex communistus is a species of ant in the genus Bothriomyrmex. Described by Santschi in 1919, the species is endemic to various countries of Europe and Asia, including Albania, Armenia, Bulgaria, Czech Republic, Georgia, Greece, Italy, Montenegro, Slovenia and Ukraine.
