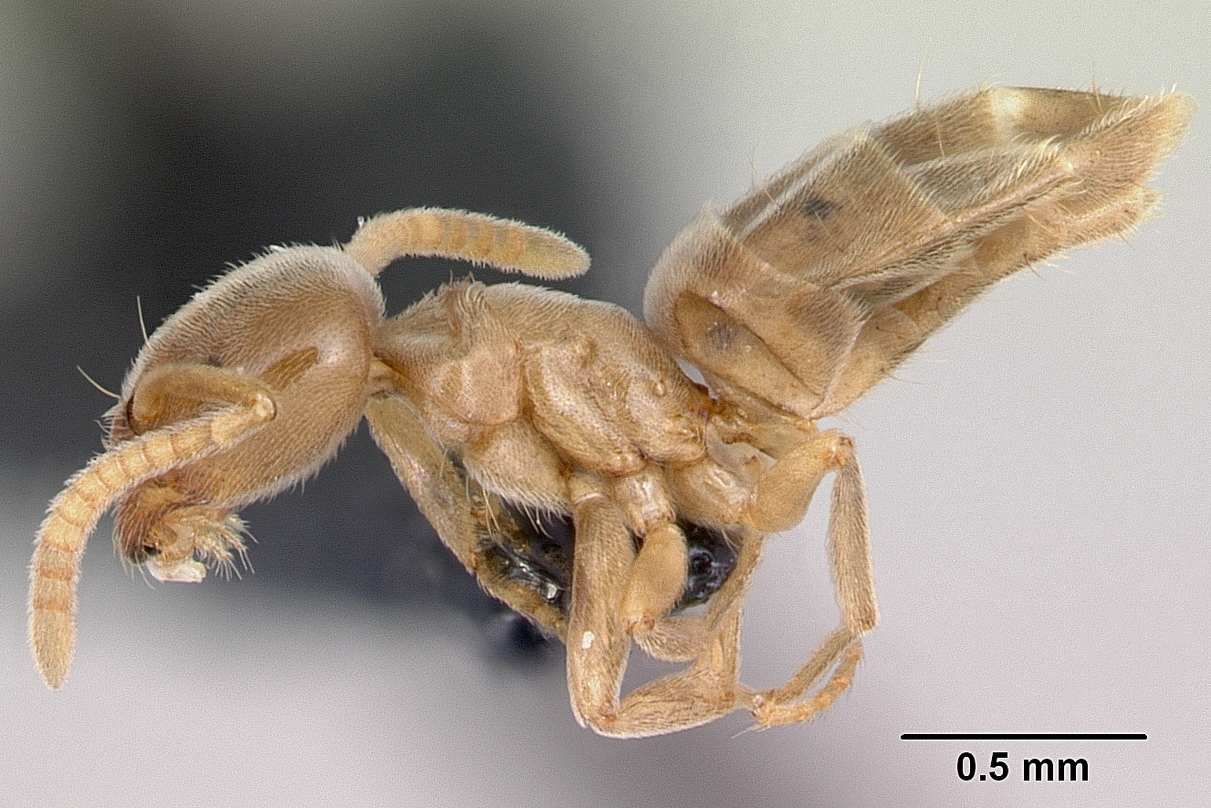
- Bothriomyrmex saundersi worker

Scientific classification
- Domain: Eukaryota
- Kingdom: Animalia
- Phylum: Arthropoda
- Class: Insecta
- Order: Hymenoptera
- Family: Formicidae
- Subfamily: Dolichoderinae
- Genus: Bothriomyrmex
- Species: B. saundersi

Binomial name
- Bothriomyrmex saundersi Santschi, 1922

Synonyms
- Bothriomyrmex rogeri Emery, 1924

= Bothriomyrmex saundersi =

Species of ant

Bothriomyrmex saundersi is a species of ant belonging to the genus Bothriomyrmex. It was first described by Santschi in 1922 and is endemic to Portugal and Spain.
