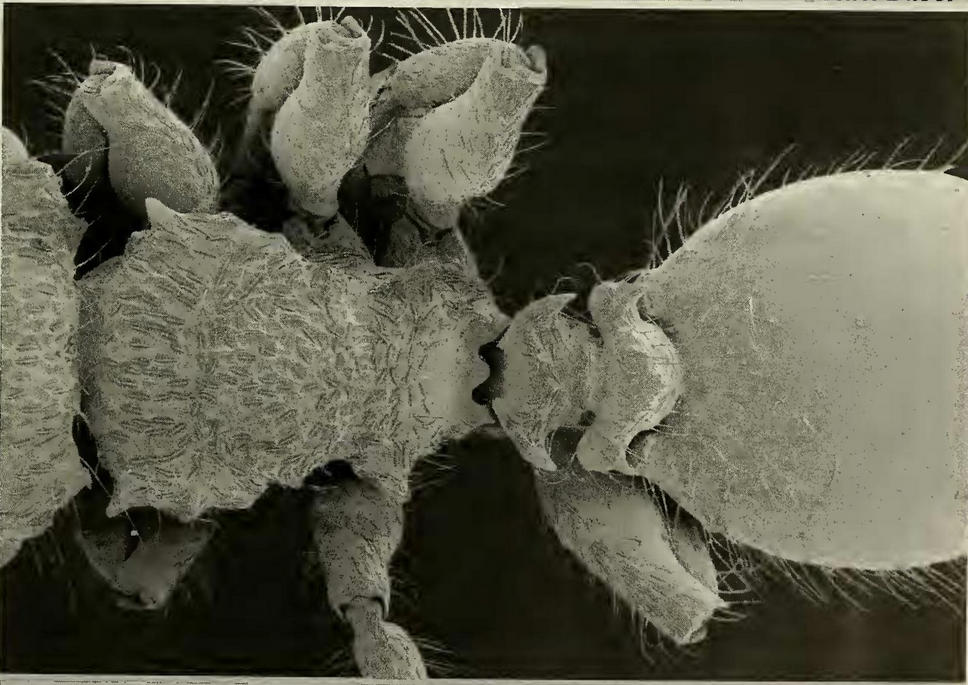

Scientific classification
- Domain: Eukaryota
- Kingdom: Animalia
- Phylum: Arthropoda
- Class: Insecta
- Order: Hymenoptera
- Family: Formicidae
- Subfamily: Myrmicinae
- Genus: Cephalotes
- Species: C. liogaster

Binomial name
- Cephalotes liogaster (Santschi, 1916)

= Cephalotes liogaster =

Species of ant

Cephalotes liogaster is a species of arboreal ant of the genus Cephalotes, characterized by an odd-shaped head and the ability to "parachute" by steering their fall if they drop off of the tree they are on. Because of this, they are colloquially referred to as gliding ants.
