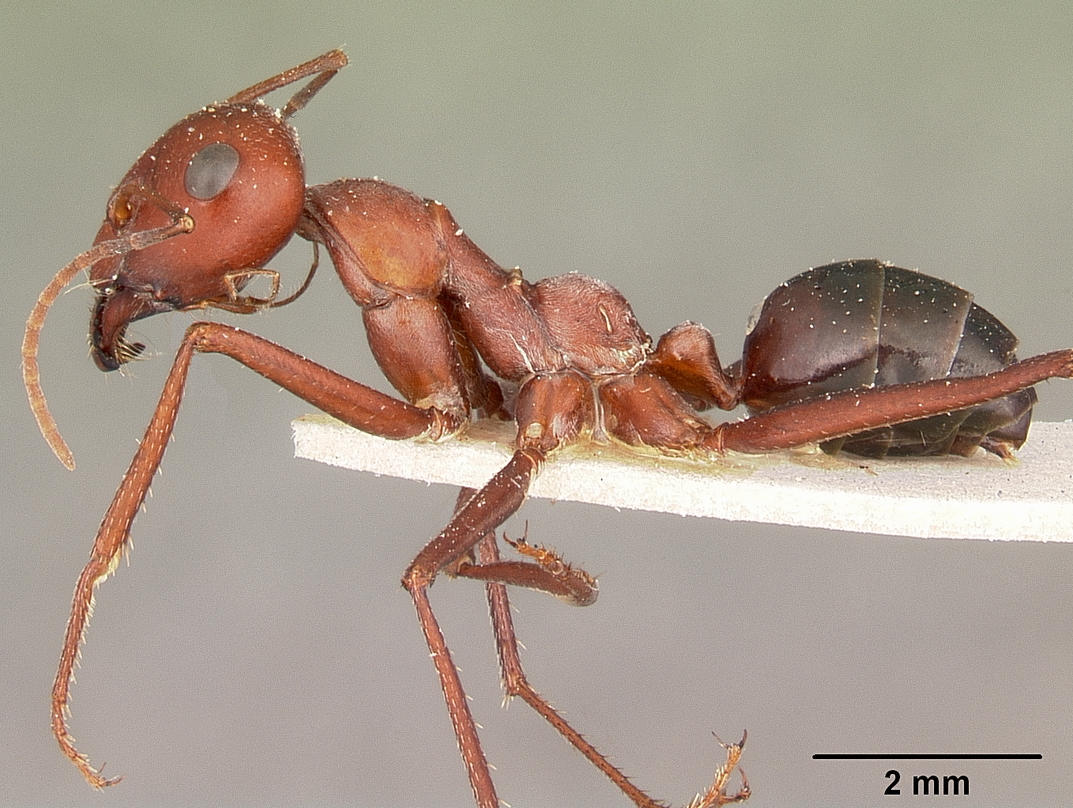
- C. bicolor worker

Scientific classification
- Domain: Eukaryota
- Kingdom: Animalia
- Phylum: Arthropoda
- Class: Insecta
- Order: Hymenoptera
- Family: Formicidae
- Subfamily: Formicinae
- Genus: Cataglyphis
- Species: C. bicolor

Binomial name
- Cataglyphis bicolor Fabricius, 1793

= Sahara Desert ant =

Species of ant

The Sahara Desert ant (Cataglyphis bicolor) is a desert-dwelling ant of the genus Cataglyphis. It primarily inhabits the Sahara Desert and is one of the most heat tolerant animals known to date. However, there are at least four other species of Cataglyphis living in the Sahara desert, for example C. bombycina, Cataglyphis savignyi, Cataglyphis mauritanicus and C. fortis. Also, specimens of C. bicolor have been found well north of Sahara.

== Background ==
Sahara Desert ants are scavengers. They forage for the corpses of insects and other arthropods which have succumbed to the heat stress of their desert environment.

While no known land animal can live permanently at a temperature over 50 °C, Sahara Desert ants can sustain a body temperature above 50 °C (122 °F), with surface temperatures of up to 70 °C (158 °F). Despite this, if out in the open, they must keep moving or else they will fry.

The ants navigate the desert terrain by using both visual spatial memory and patterns in skylight. When light strikes the ant's ommatidia, it is uniformly mapped along the ant's eye, creating a grid that can be used to determine its location.
