= Bothriomyrmex corsicus =

Scientific classification
- Kingdom: Animalia
- Phylum: Arthropoda
- Class: Insecta
- Order: Hymenoptera
- Family: Formicidae
- Subfamily: Dolichoderinae
- Genus: Bothriomyrmex
- Species: B. corsicus

Binomial name
- Bothriomyrmex corsicus Santschi, 1923

Synonyms
- Bothriomyrmex corsicus gallicus Emery, 1925; Bothriomyrmex meridionalis gibbus Soudek, 1925; Bothriomyrmex corsicus ligurica Emery, 1925; Bothriomyrmex menozzii Emery, 1925

Species of ant

Bothriomyrmex corsicus is a species of ant in the genus Bothriomyrmex. Described by Santschi in 1923, the species is endemic to various European countries, including Austria, Bulgaria, Czech Republic, France, Greece, Hungary, Italy, Liechtenstein, Monaco, Montenegro, Romania, Serbia, Slovakia, Slovenia, Spain, Switzerland, Turkey, Ukraine.
