= Crematogaster cristata =

Scientific classification
- Domain: Eukaryota
- Kingdom: Animalia
- Phylum: Arthropoda
- Class: Insecta
- Order: Hymenoptera
- Family: Formicidae
- Subfamily: Myrmicinae
- Genus: Crematogaster
- Species: C. cristata

Binomial name
- Crematogaster cristata Santschi, 1929

Species of ant

Crematogaster cristata is a species of ant in tribe Crematogastrini. It was described by Santschi in 1929.
