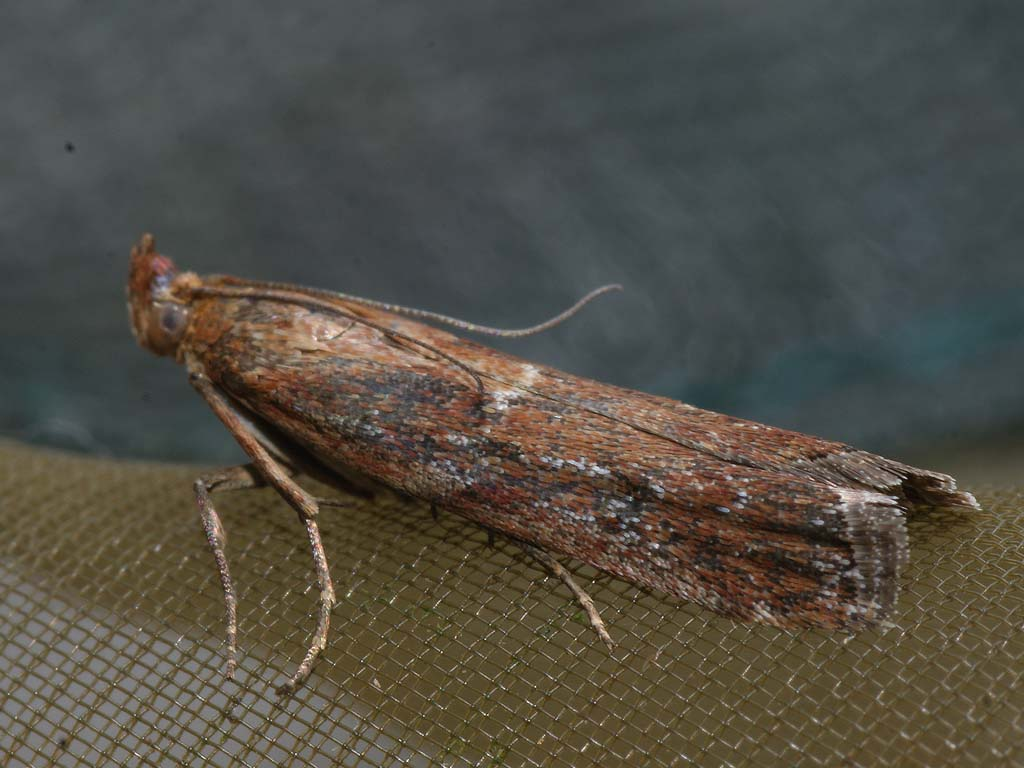
- Adult

Scientific classification
- Kingdom: Animalia
- Phylum: Arthropoda
- Clade: Pancrustacea
- Class: Insecta
- Order: Lepidoptera
- Family: Pyralidae
- Genus: Moitrelia
- Species: M. obductella

Binomial name
- Moitrelia obductella (Zeller, 1839)

Synonyms
- Pempelia obductella Zeller, 1839; Salebria origanella Schlager, 1848

= Moitrelia obductella =

Species of moth

Moitrelia obductella is a species of snout moth. It is found in most of Europe (except Ireland, Fennoscandia, Estonia, Latvia and Ukraine).

The wingspan is 23–26 mm. Adults are on wing from the second half of July to early August.

The larvae feed on Origanum (including Origanum vulgare), Mentha, Calamintha and Thymus species.
