= Rivacindela =

Scientific classification
- Domain: Eukaryota
- Kingdom: Animalia
- Phylum: Arthropoda
- Class: Insecta
- Order: Coleoptera
- Suborder: Adephaga
- Family: Cicindelidae
- Genus: Rivacindela; Nidek, 1973

Genus of beetles

Rivacindela is a genus of beetles in the family Cicindelidae, containing the following species, all of which are found only in Australia:

- Rivacindela aurifodina Sumlin, 1997
- Rivacindela avita Sumlin, 1997
- Rivacindela blackburni Sloane, 1906
- Rivacindela browni Sloane, 1913
- Rivacindela cardinalba Sumlin, 1987
- Rivacindela cibdela Sumlin, 1997
- Rivacindela collita Sumlin, 1987
- Rivacindela eburneola Sumlin, 1997
- Rivacindela gagei Sumlin, 1997
- Rivacindela gairdneri Freitag, 1979
- Rivacindela gillesensis Hudson, 1994
- Rivacindela hudsoni Sumlin, 1997
- Rivacindela igneicollis Bates, 1874
- Rivacindela igneicolloides Sumlin, 1992
- Rivacindela jungi Blackburn, 1901
- Rivacindela labyrintha Sumlin, 1997
- Rivacindela leucothrix Sumlin, 1997
- Rivacindela necopinata Sumlin, 1997
- Rivacindela nudohumeralis Sumlin, 1997
- Rivacindela ozellae Sumlin, 1987
- Rivacindela praecipua Sumlin, 1997
- Rivacindela pseudotrepida Sumlin, 1997
- Rivacindela saetigera Horn, 1893
- Rivacindela salicursoria Sumlin, 1987
- Rivacindela shetterlyi Sumlin, 1997
- Rivacindela trepida Sumlin, 1997
- Rivacindela trichogena Sumlin, 1997
- Rivacindela vannidekiana Sumlin, 1988
- Rivacindela velox Sumlin, 1987
- Rivacindela webbae Sumlin, 1997
