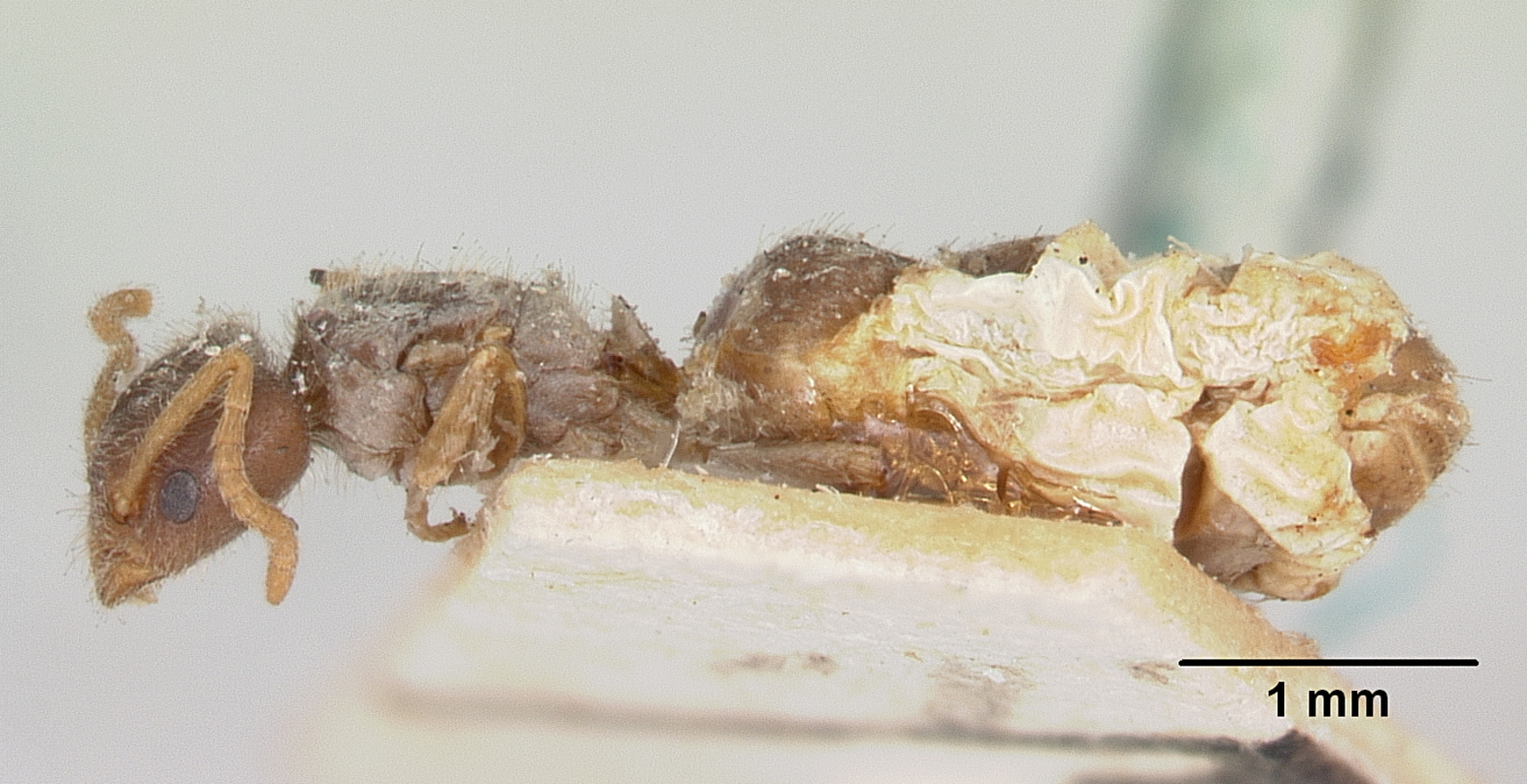
- Bothriomyrmex atlantis dealate queen

Scientific classification
- Domain: Eukaryota
- Kingdom: Animalia
- Phylum: Arthropoda
- Class: Insecta
- Order: Hymenoptera
- Family: Formicidae
- Subfamily: Dolichoderinae
- Genus: Bothriomyrmex
- Species: B. atlantis

Binomial name
- Bothriomyrmex atlantis Forel, 1894

Subspecies
- Bothriomyrmex atlantis inquilinus Santschi, 1919; Bothriomyrmex atlantis perfidus Santschi, 1926

= Bothriomyrmex atlantis =

Species of ant

Bothriomyrmex atlantis is a species of ant in the genus Bothriomyrmex. Described by Forel in 1894, the species can be found in Algeria, Morocco, and Tunisia.
