= Bothriomyrmex breviceps =

Scientific classification
- Domain: Eukaryota
- Kingdom: Animalia
- Phylum: Arthropoda
- Class: Insecta
- Order: Hymenoptera
- Family: Formicidae
- Subfamily: Dolichoderinae
- Genus: Bothriomyrmex
- Species: B. breviceps

Binomial name
- Bothriomyrmex breviceps Santschi, 1919

Species of ant

Bothriomyrmex breviceps is a species of ant in the genus Bothriomyrmex. Described by Santschi in 1919, the species can be found in Tunisia and Algeria.
