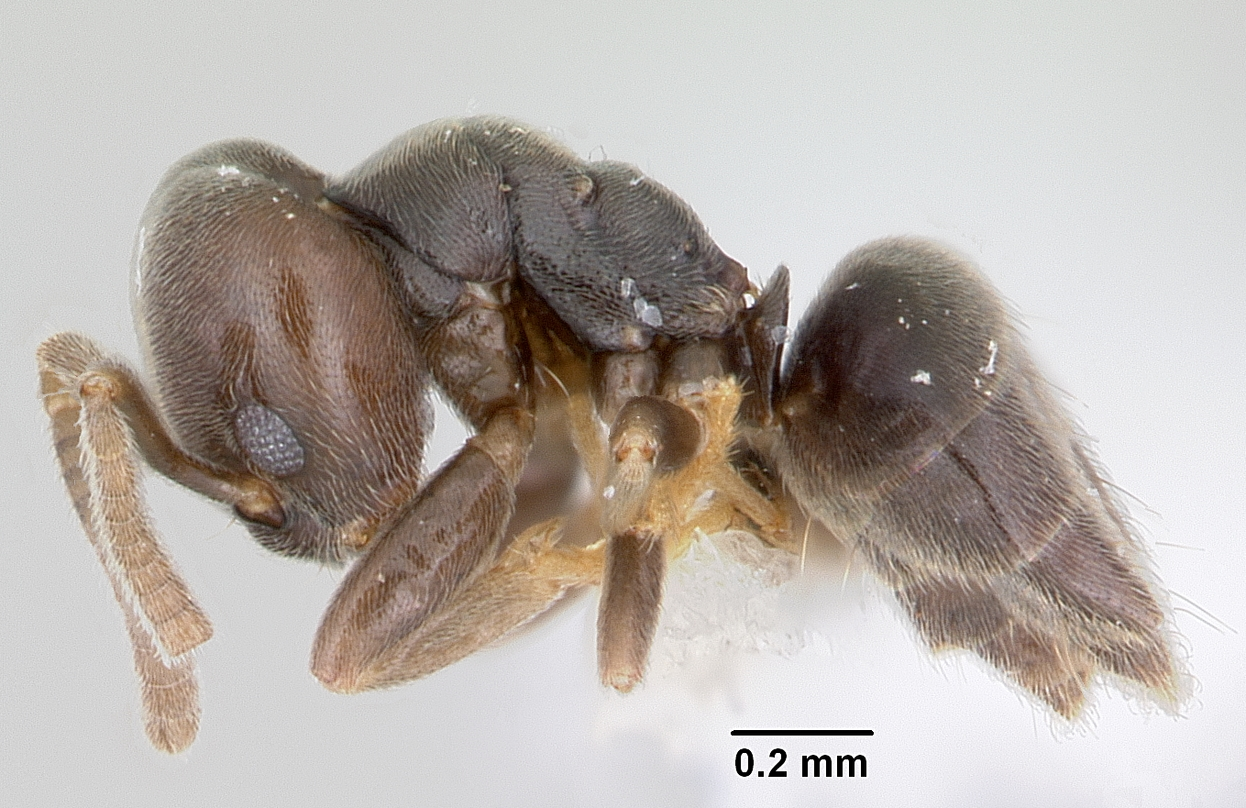
- B. paradoxus worker from Costa Rica

Scientific classification
- Domain: Eukaryota
- Kingdom: Animalia
- Phylum: Arthropoda
- Class: Insecta
- Order: Hymenoptera
- Family: Formicidae
- Subfamily: Dolichoderinae
- Tribe: Bothriomyrmecini
- Genus: Bothriomyrmex; Emery, 1869

Type species
- Bothriomyrmex costae Emery, 1869

Diversity
- 23 species

= Bothriomyrmex =

Genus of ants

Bothriomyrmex is a genus of ants in the subfamily Dolichoderinae.

== Distribution and habitat ==
The genus is widely distributed in the Old World and Australia, where it is found nesting in a wide range of habitats (including grasslands, savanna woodlands, mallee forests and lowland rainforest). They nest in soil or in rotten wood.

== Species ==
- Bothriomyrmex anastasiae Dubovikov, 2002
- Bothriomyrmex atlantis Forel, 1894
- Bothriomyrmex breviceps Santschi, 1919
- Bothriomyrmex communistus Santschi, 1919
- Bothriomyrmex corsicus Santschi, 1923
- Bothriomyrmex costae Emery, 1869
- Bothriomyrmex crosi Santschi, 1919
- Bothriomyrmex cuculus Santschi, 1919
- Bothriomyrmex decapitans Santschi, 1911
- Bothriomyrmex emarginatus Santschi, 1919
- Bothriomyrmex jannonei Menozzi, 1936
- Bothriomyrmex kusnezovi Emery, 1925
- Bothriomyrmex laticeps Emery, 1925
- Bothriomyrmex meridionalis (Roger, 1863)
- Bothriomyrmex modestus Radchenko, 1985
- Bothriomyrmex paradoxus Dubovikoff & Longino, 2004
- Bothriomyrmex pubens Santschi, 1919
- Bothriomyrmex regicidus Santschi, 1919
- Bothriomyrmex salsurae Donisthorpe, 1944
- Bothriomyrmex saundersi Santschi, 1922
- Bothriomyrmex syrius Forel, 1910
- Bothriomyrmex turcomenicus Emery, 1925
- Bothriomyrmex urartus Dubovikov, 2002
