= Moitrelia hispanella =

Scientific classification
- Domain: Eukaryota
- Kingdom: Animalia
- Phylum: Arthropoda
- Class: Insecta
- Order: Lepidoptera
- Family: Pyralidae
- Genus: Moitrelia
- Species: M. hispanella

Binomial name
- Moitrelia hispanella (Staudinger, 1859)

Synonyms
- Pempelia hispanella Staudinger, 1859; Pempilia ornatella var. marocanella D. Lucas, 1932

Species of moth

Moitrelia hispanella is a species of snout moth. It is found in Spain, Portugal, France and North Africa, including Morocco.

The wingspan is 18–22 mm.
