= Moitrelia italogallicella =

Scientific classification
- Domain: Eukaryota
- Kingdom: Animalia
- Phylum: Arthropoda
- Class: Insecta
- Order: Lepidoptera
- Family: Pyralidae
- Genus: Moitrelia
- Species: M. italogallicella

Binomial name
- Moitrelia italogallicella (Millière, 1882)

Synonyms
- Pempelia italo-gallicella Millière, 1882; Pempelia italogallicella; Pempeliella italogallicella

Species of moth

Moitrelia italogallicella is a species of snout moth described by Pierre Millière in 1882. It is found in Spain, France, Italy and on Malta.
