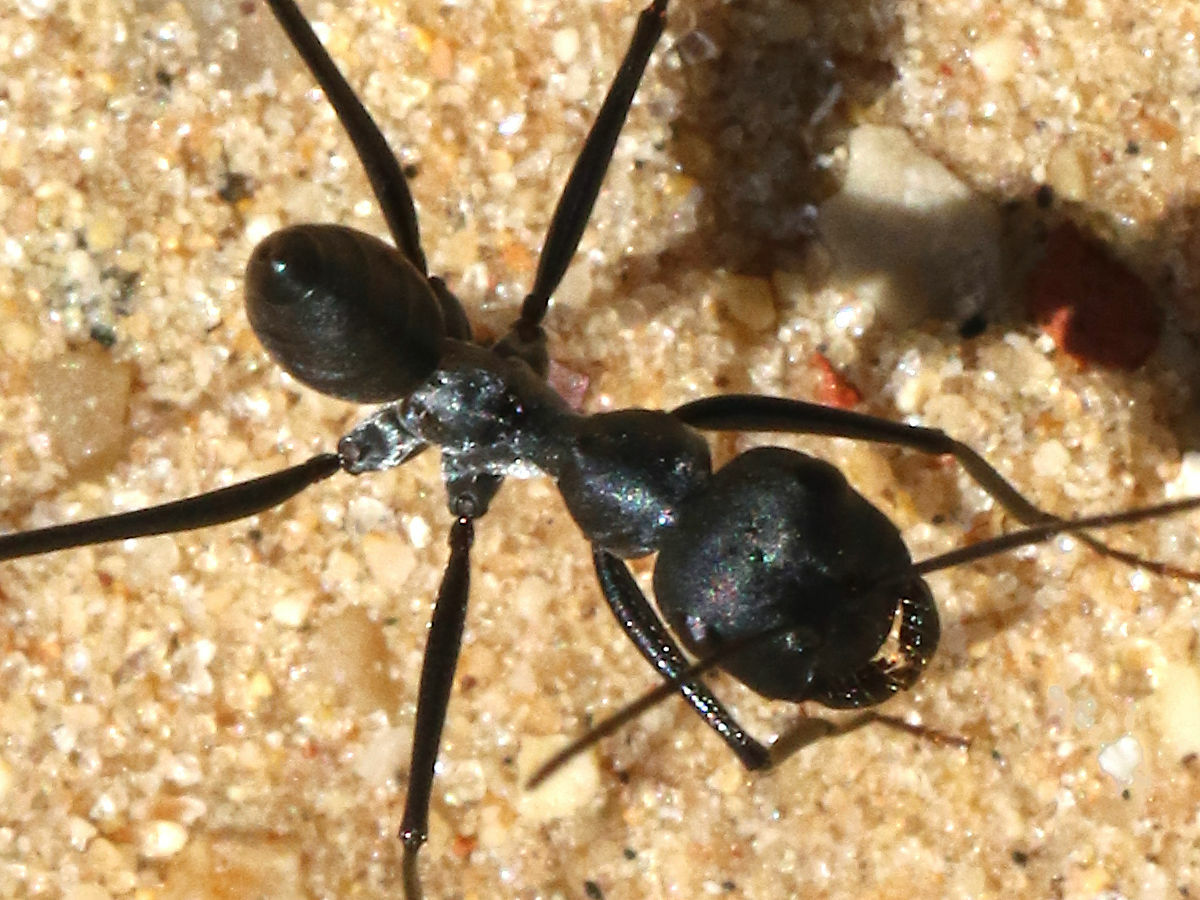

Scientific classification
- Kingdom: Animalia
- Phylum: Arthropoda
- Clade: Pancrustacea
- Class: Insecta
- Order: Hymenoptera
- Family: Formicidae
- Subfamily: Formicinae
- Genus: Cataglyphis
- Species: C. nigra

Binomial name
- Cataglyphis nigra (André, 1881)

= Cataglyphis nigra =

Species of ant

Cataglyphis nigra, also known as the black desert ant, is a species of ant in the genus Cataglyphis.

== Range ==
This species is found in North Africa, the Levant, and the northern regions of the Arabian Peninsula.

== Behavior ==
Like other ants in the genus, Cataglyphis nigra workers can raise their gaster (abdomen) to a vertical position; this is thought to improve mobility in desert habitats.

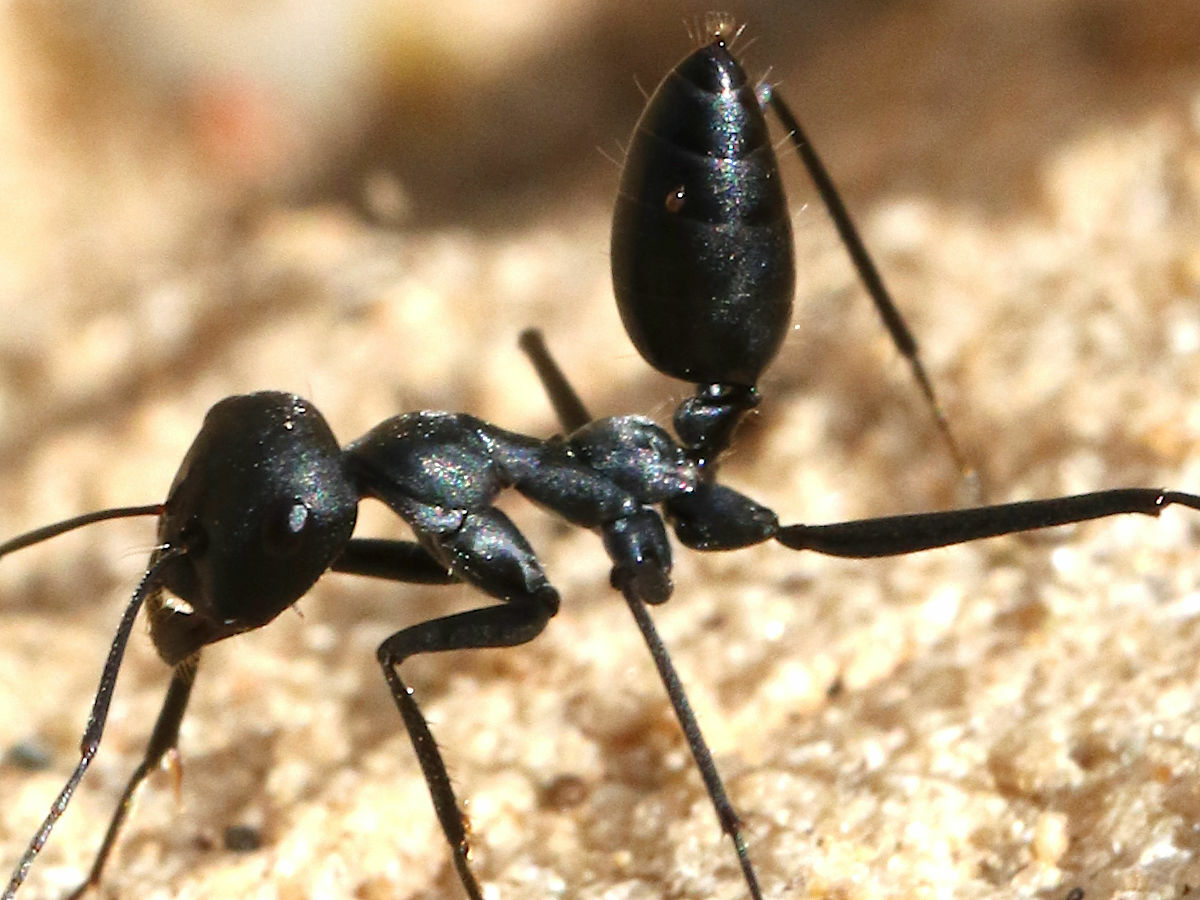
C. nigra with raised gaster
