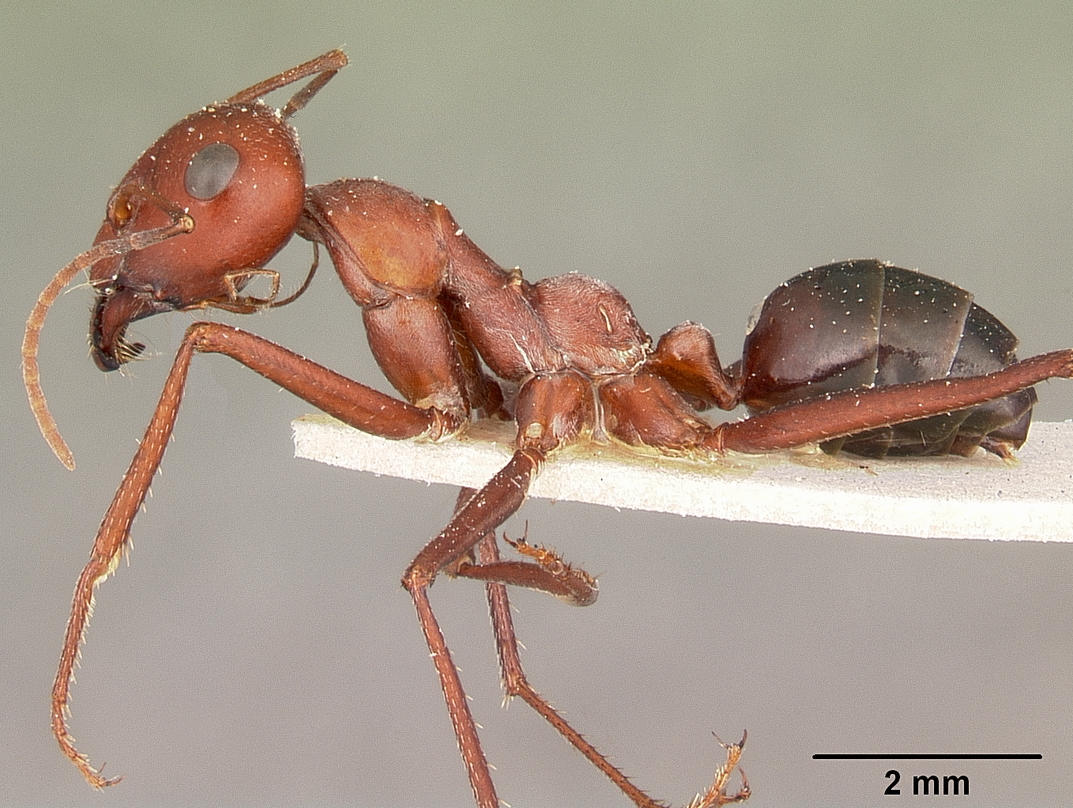
- Cataglyphis bicolor worker

Scientific classification
- Kingdom: Animalia
- Phylum: Arthropoda
- Class: Insecta
- Order: Hymenoptera
- Family: Formicidae
- Subfamily: Formicinae
- Tribe: Formicini
- Genus: Cataglyphis; Förster, 1850

Diversity
- 105 species

Synonyms
- Eomonocombus Arnol'di, 1968; Machaeromyrma Forel, 1916; Monocombus Mayr, 1855; Paraformica Forel, 1915

= Cataglyphis =

Genus of ants

Cataglyphis is a genus of ant, desert ants, in the subfamily Formicinae. Its most famous species is C. bicolor, the Sahara Desert ant, which runs on hot sand to find insects that died of heat exhaustion, and can, like other several other Cataglyphis species, sustain body temperatures up to 50°C. Cataglyphis is also the name of an autonomous rover that won the NASA Sample Return Robot Centennial Challenge inspired by the navigation approaches used by desert ants.

== Name ==
It was named in 1850, with reference to the impressions of its abdomen: "Von χατά und γλυψίς der Einschnitt. Eine Andeutung auf die vielen Einschnitte oder vielmehr Eindrücke de Hinterleibs."

== Description ==
Species of this genus are behaviourally, morphologically, and physiologically adapted to dry and hot habitats.

== Navigational behaviour ==
In the Sahara, ants live where no bushes or clumps of grass are available to protect them, and where tracks are covered by wind-blown sand in seconds. The midday sun is so hot that even the permanent residents, sand lizards, insects, and a few birds, have to take shelter, but this is when, for not much more than an hour, Cataglyphis spp. are to come out of their underground nests and forage. They can withstand higher temperatures than any other insects. They pour out on to the sand and search for insects that have died of heat stress. Each ant dashes about in zigzag patterns, but as soon as one is lucky enough to find a tiny insect corpse, it has to get it back to the nest quickly before the ant dies of the heat. It does not retrace the zig-zagging path of its outward journey; even if a scent trail made this possible, such a route would be time-wasting. Instead, it runs in a straight line directly back to its nest hole.

On its outward journey, it zig-zags right and left. Every time it changes direction, it lifts its head and wheels around to take a bearing on the sun. In addition, it has to remember how far it went on each straight run. When time to head for home, it has to sum all these data and come out with the precise direction needed. Some outward journeys take an ant a quarter of an hour, with sun sightings every few seconds.

In an experiment, individual ants were fitted with an apparatus that blocked direct sight of the sun, while giving a false impression of where the sun was, using a mirror. When these ants headed for home, they dashed off to a point in the desert displaced by just the amount that the mirror had shifted the sun's position.

Like ants in the Crematogaster genus, Cataglyphis workers can raise their gaster (abdomen) to a vertical position in an acrobat manner. This behavior may serve as a defensive gesture in Crematogaster (acrobat) ants, but in Cataglyphis this is thought to improve mobility in desert habitats.

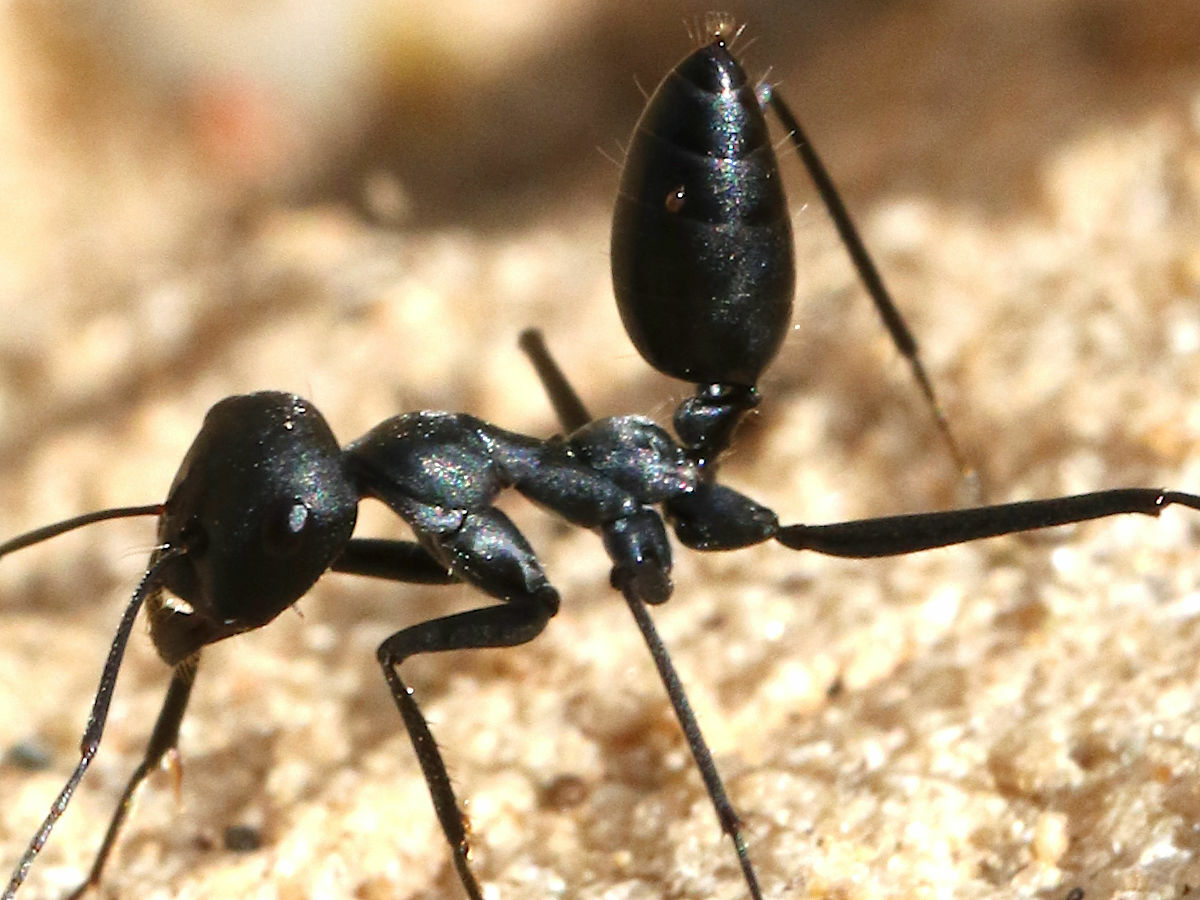
C. nigra with raised gaster

== Distribution ==
At least five different species of Cataglyphis occur in the Sahara Desert, which may be considered the center of distribution for this genus. Five species also occur in Israel. Some species reach into southern Russia, southern Spain, Greece, the former Yugoslavia, Hungary, the European part of Turkey, and the Aral-Caspian area near Tijanchan.

== Parthenogenesis ==
Queen ants of the species C. cursor can produce female reproductive progeny (i.e. potential new queens or gynes) by parthenogenesis. Parthenogenesis, in this case, involves, a process (automictic thelytoky) by which two haploid products of meiosis fuse to form a diploid zygote that develops into a gyne. Queens can also produce female worker ants by sexual reproduction involving fertilisation of eggs.

== Species ==
=== Extant ===
- Cataglyphis abudawoodi Sharaf, 2026
- Cataglyphis abyssinica (Forel, 1904)
- Cataglyphis acutinodis Collingwood & Agosti, 1996
- Cataglyphis adenensis (Forel, 1904)
- Cataglyphis aenescens (Nylander, 1849)
- Cataglyphis agostii Sharaf, 2007
- Cataglyphis albicans (Roger, 1859)
- Cataglyphis alibabae Pisarski, 1965
- Cataglyphis altisquamis (André, 1881)
- Cataglyphis aphrodite Salata et al., 2023
- Cataglyphis arenaria Finzi, 1940
- Cataglyphis argentata (Radoszkowsky, 1876)
- Cataglyphis asiriensis Collingwood, 1985
- Cataglyphis aurata Menozzi, 1932
- Cataglyphis bazoftensis Khalili-Moghadam et al., 2021
- Cataglyphis bellicosa (Karavaiev, 1924)
- Cataglyphis bergiana Arnol'di, 1964
- Cataglyphis bicolor (Fabricius, 1793)
- Cataglyphis bombycina (Roger, 1859)
- Cataglyphis bucharica Emery, 1925
- Cataglyphis cana Santschi, 1925
- Cataglyphis chionistrae Salata et al., 2023
- Cataglyphis cinnamomea (Karavaiev, 1910)
- Cataglyphis convexus Oueslati et al., 2023
- Cataglyphis cretica (Forel, 1910)
- Cataglyphis cubica (Forel, 1903)
- Cataglyphis cugiai Menozzi, 1939
- Cataglyphis cuneinodis Arnol'di, 1964
- Cataglyphis cursor (Fonscolombe, 1846)
- Cataglyphis dejdaranensis Khalili-Moghadam et al., 2021
- Cataglyphis diehlii (Forel, 1902)
- Cataglyphis douwesi De Haro & Collingwood, 2000
- Cataglyphis elegantissima Arnol'di, 1968
- Cataglyphis emeryi (Karavaiev, 1911)
- Cataglyphis emmae (Forel, 1909)
- Cataglyphis espadaleri Cagniant, 2009
- Cataglyphis fici Salata et al., 2021
- Cataglyphis fisheri Sharaf & Aldawood, 2015
- Cataglyphis flavitibia Chang & He, 2002
- Cataglyphis flavobrunnea Collingwood & Agosti, 1996
- Cataglyphis floricola Tinaut, 1993
- Cataglyphis foreli (Ruzsky, 1903)
- Cataglyphis fortis (Forel, 1902)
- Cataglyphis fossilis Cagniant, 2009
- Cataglyphis frigida (André, 1881)
- Cataglyphis fritillariae Khalili-Moghadam et al., 2021
- Cataglyphis gadeai De Haro & Collingwood, 2003
- Cataglyphis gaetula Santschi, 1929
- Cataglyphis glabilabia Chang & He, 2002
- Cataglyphis golestanica Salata et al., 2025
- Cataglyphis gracilens Santschi, 1929
- Cataglyphis hannae Agosti, 1994
- Cataglyphis harteni Collingwood & Agosti, 1996
- Cataglyphis helanensis Chang & He, 2002
- Cataglyphis hellenica (Forel, 1886)
- Cataglyphis hispanica (Emery, 1906)
- Cataglyphis holgerseni Collingwood & Agosti, 1996
- Cataglyphis humeya Tinaut, 1991
- Cataglyphis iberica (Emery, 1906)
- Cataglyphis indica Pisarski, 1962
- Cataglyphis isis (Forel, 1913)
- Cataglyphis israelensis Ionescu & Eyer, 2016
- Cataglyphis italica (Emery, 1906)
- Cataglyphis kurdistanica Pisarski, 1965
- Cataglyphis laevior Santschi, 1929
- Cataglyphis lirabiensis Khalili-Moghadam et al., 2023
- Cataglyphis livida (André, 1881)
- Cataglyphis lunatica Baroni Urbani, 1969
- Cataglyphis lutea Weber, 1952
- Cataglyphis machmal Radchenko & Arakelian, 1991
- Cataglyphis marroui Cagniant, 2009
- Cataglyphis mauritanica (Emery, 1906)
- Cataglyphis minima Collingwood, 1985
- Cataglyphis minos Borowiec & Salata, 2022
- Cataglyphis nigra (André, 1881)
- Cataglyphis nigripes Arnol'di, 1964
- Cataglyphis nodus (Brullé, 1833)
- Cataglyphis oasium Menozzi, 1932
- Cataglyphis opacior Collingwood & Agosti, 1996
- Cataglyphis otini Santschi, 1929
- Cataglyphis oxiana Arnol'di, 1964
- Cataglyphis pallida Mayr, 1877
- Cataglyphis piligera Arnol'di, 1964
- Cataglyphis piliscapa (Forel, 1901)
- Cataglyphis pilisquamis Santschi, 1929
- Cataglyphis pubescens Radchenko & Paknia, 2010
- Cataglyphis rosenhaueri Santschi, 1925
- Cataglyphis rubra (Forel, 1903)
- Cataglyphis sabulosa Kugler, 1981
- Cataglyphis saharae Santschi, 1929
- Cataglyphis savignyi (Dufour, 1862)
- Cataglyphis semitonsa Santschi, 1929
- Cataglyphis setipes (Forel, 1894)
- Cataglyphis shahrekordensis Khalili-Moghadam et al., 2023
- Cataglyphis shuaibensis Collingwood & Agosti, 1996
- Cataglyphis stigmata Radchenko & Paknia, 2010
- Cataglyphis takyrica Dlussky, 1990
- Cataglyphis tartessica Amor & Ortega, 2014
- Cataglyphis theryi Santschi, 1921
- Cataglyphis urens Collingwood, 1985
- Cataglyphis vaucheri (Emery, 1906)
- Cataglyphis velox Santschi, 1929
- Cataglyphis viatica (Fabricius, 1787)
- Cataglyphis viaticoides (André, 1881)
- Cataglyphis zakharovi Radchenko, 1997

=== Unidentifiable ===
A number of species tentatively placed within the genus have subsequently been determined as unidentifiable to the species level, although they technically remain valid binomen.

- Cataglyphis bicoloripes Walker, 1871
- Cataglyphis longipedem (Eichwald, 1841)
