= Cataglyphis tartessica =

Scientific classification
- Domain: Eukaryota
- Kingdom: Animalia
- Phylum: Arthropoda
- Class: Insecta
- Order: Hymenoptera
- Family: Formicidae
- Subfamily: Formicinae
- Genus: Cataglyphis
- Species: C. tartessica

Binomial name
- Cataglyphis tartessica (Amor & Ortega, 2014)

Species of ant

Cataglyphis tartessica is an ant species of the genus Cataglyphis, it is endemic to Spain, mostly Western Andalucia, in the provinces of Huelva, Seville and Cadiz.

It belongs in a group shared by Cataglyphis floricola.

Coloration wise this species looks similar to Cataglyphis velox with redish orange head and thorax and black gaster, although C. tartessica is more orange while C. velox is more brownish. One of the main physical differentiations is the shape of the petiole.
