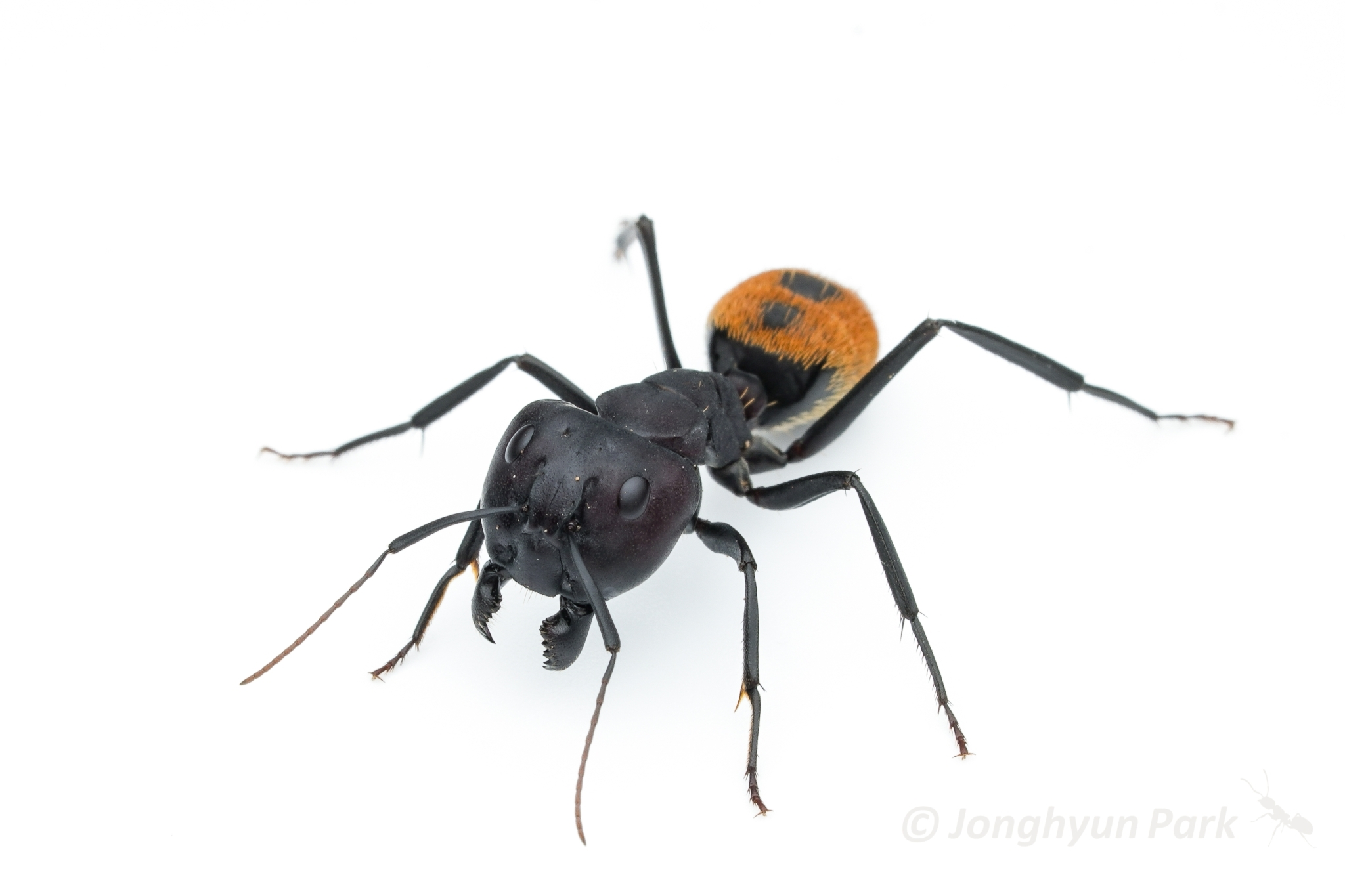

Scientific classification
- Kingdom: Animalia
- Phylum: Arthropoda
- Class: Insecta
- Order: Hymenoptera
- Family: Formicidae
- Subfamily: Formicinae
- Genus: Camponotus
- Species: C. fulvopilosus

Binomial name
- Camponotus fulvopilosus (De Geer, 1778)

Synonyms
- List: Camponotus fulvopilosus detritoides Forel, 1910; Camponotus fulvopilosus flavopilosus Emery, 1895; Formica pilosa Olivier, 1792; Formica rufiventris Fabricius, 1804

= Camponotus fulvopilosus =

Carpenter ant endemic to Southern Africa

Camponotus fulvopilosus, commonly known as the Karoo balbyter ant and yellow-haired sugar ant, is a species of carpenter ant endemic to the arid regions of Southern Africa.

== Range and habitat ==
Camponotus fulvopilosus is found in rocky habitat in the arid regions of western Southern Africa; from Angola, Botswana and the Democratic Republic of the Congo, to Namibia and South Africa.

== Behaviour ==
When threatened, Camponotus fulvopilosus spray formic acid from its venom gland. When returning from foraging, the Karoo balbyter uses path integration along with landmark navigation to find its way back to the nest.

== Gallery ==
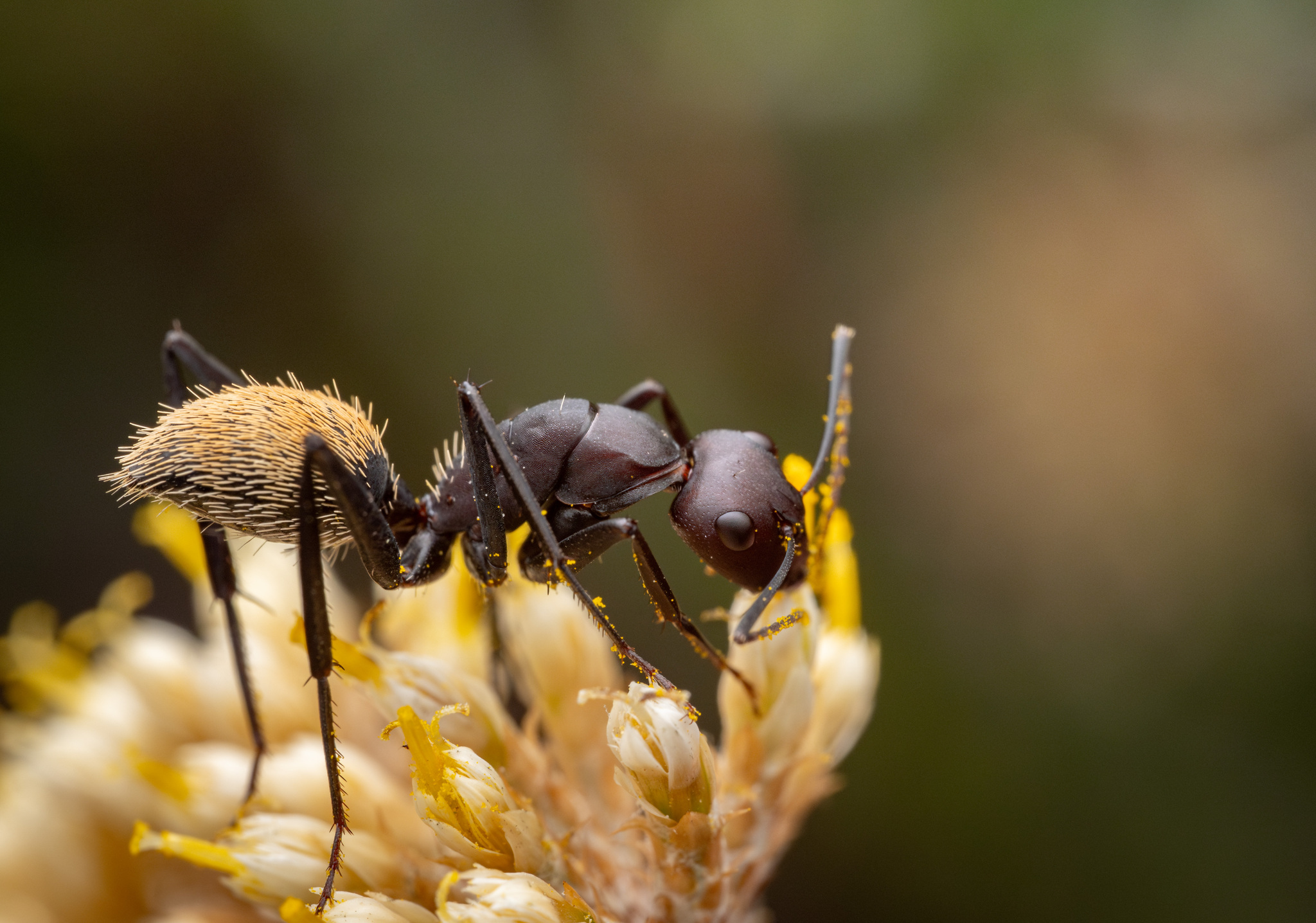
Foraging

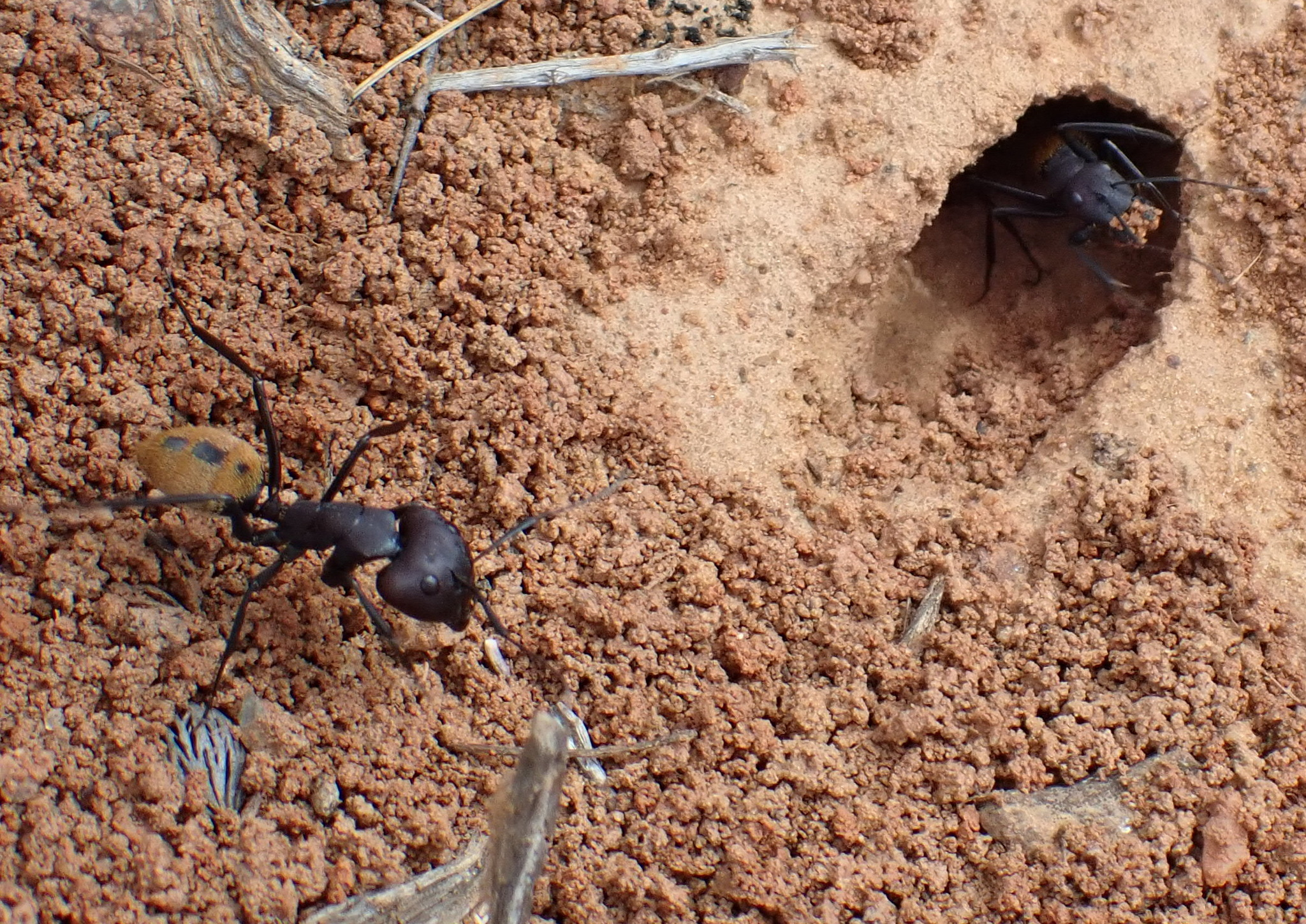
Nest opening
