= Bothriomyrmex emarginatus =

Scientific classification
- Domain: Eukaryota
- Kingdom: Animalia
- Phylum: Arthropoda
- Class: Insecta
- Order: Hymenoptera
- Family: Formicidae
- Subfamily: Dolichoderinae
- Genus: Bothriomyrmex
- Species: B. emarginatus

Binomial name
- Bothriomyrmex emarginatus Santschi, 1919

Species of ant

Bothriomyrmex emarginatus is a species of ant in the genus Bothriomyrmex. Described by Santschi in 1911, the species is endemic to Tunisia.
