= Bothriomyrmex modestus =

Scientific classification
- Domain: Eukaryota
- Kingdom: Animalia
- Phylum: Arthropoda
- Class: Insecta
- Order: Hymenoptera
- Family: Formicidae
- Subfamily: Dolichoderinae
- Genus: Bothriomyrmex
- Species: B. modestus

Binomial name
- Bothriomyrmex modestus Radchenko, 1985

Species of ant

Bothriomyrmex modestus is a species of ant in the genus Bothriomyrmex. Described by Radchenko in 1985, the species is endemic to the Russian Federation and Ukraine.
