= Moitrelia thymiella =

Scientific classification
- Kingdom: Animalia
- Phylum: Arthropoda
- Clade: Pancrustacea
- Class: Insecta
- Order: Lepidoptera
- Family: Pyralidae
- Genus: Moitrelia
- Species: M. thymiella

Binomial name
- Moitrelia thymiella (Zeller, 1846)

Synonyms
- Pempelia thymiella Zeller, 1846

Species of moth

Moitrelia thymiella is a species of snout moth. It is found in Italy and Turkey.
