= Moitrelia =

Scientific classification
- Domain: Eukaryota
- Kingdom: Animalia
- Phylum: Arthropoda
- Class: Insecta
- Order: Lepidoptera
- Family: Pyralidae
- Subfamily: Phycitinae
- Tribe: Phycitini
- Genus: Moitrelia; Leraut, 2001

Genus of moths

Moitrelia is a genus of snout moths.

== Species ==
- Moitrelia boeticella (Ragonot, 1887)
- Moitrelia hispanella Staudinger, 1859
- Moitrelia italogallicella (Milliere, 1882)
- Moitrelia obductella (Zeller, 1839)
- Moitrelia thymiella (Zeller, 1846)
