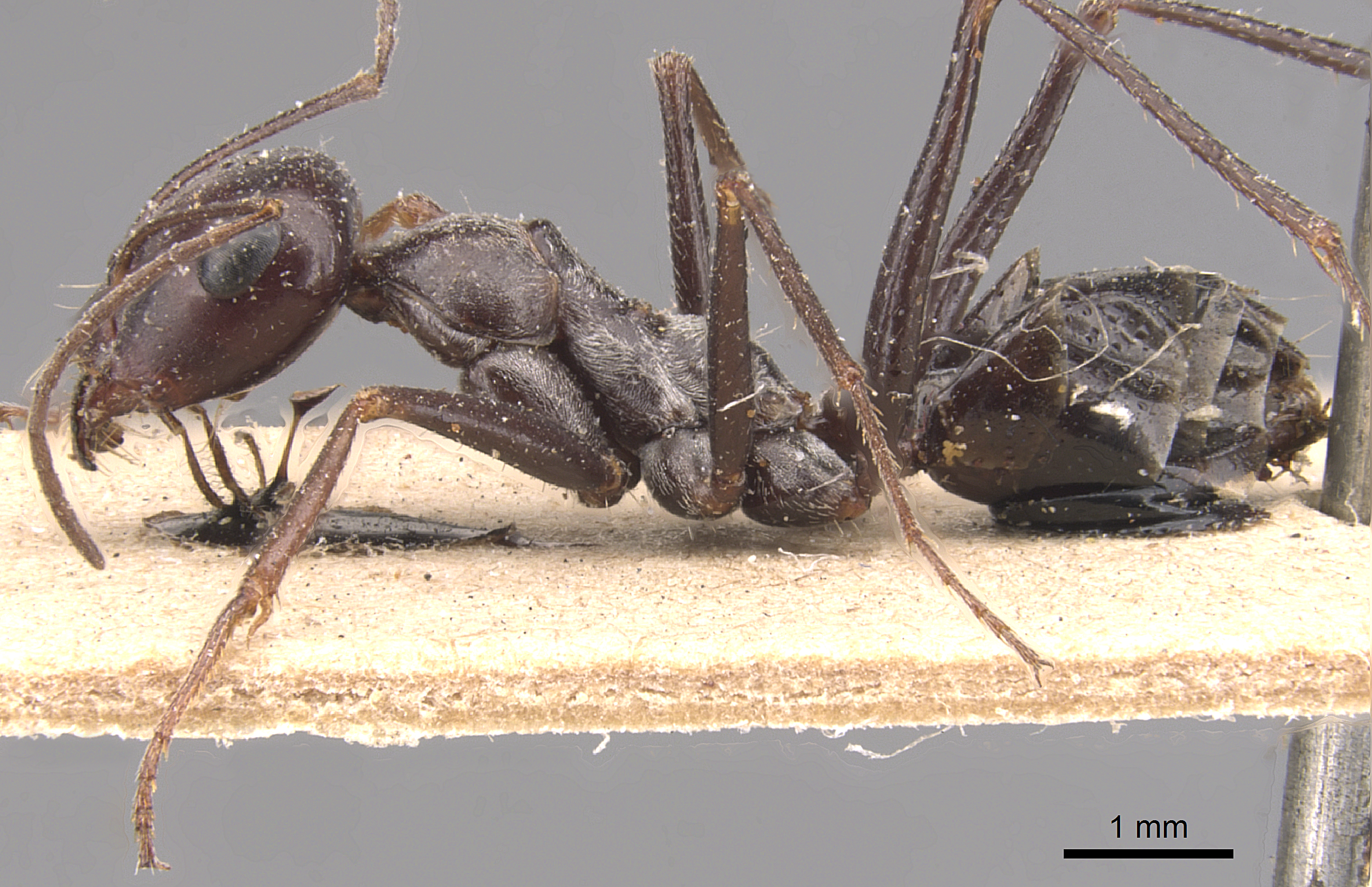

Scientific classification
- Kingdom: Animalia
- Phylum: Arthropoda
- Class: Insecta
- Order: Hymenoptera
- Family: Formicidae
- Subfamily: Formicinae
- Genus: Cataglyphis
- Species: C. iberica

Binomial name
- Cataglyphis iberica (Emery, 1906)

Synonyms
- Myrmecocystus albicans ssp. ibericus Emery, 1906; Cataglyphis albicans st. ibericus Santschi, 1919; Cataglyphis (Cataglyphis) albicans ssp. iberica Emery, 1925; Cataglyphis (Cataglyphis) albicans st. iberica Santschi, 1929; Cataglyphis iberica Collingwood and Yarrow, 1969

= Cataglyphis iberica =

Species of ant

Cataglyphis iberica is a species of desert ant found in the Iberian Peninsula. It was described by Carlo Emery in 1906.
