= Bothriomyrmex costae =

Scientific classification
- Domain: Eukaryota
- Kingdom: Animalia
- Phylum: Arthropoda
- Class: Insecta
- Order: Hymenoptera
- Family: Formicidae
- Subfamily: Dolichoderinae
- Genus: Bothriomyrmex
- Species: B. costae

Binomial name
- Bothriomyrmex costae Emery, 1869

Species of ant

Bothriomyrmex costae is a species of ant in the genus Bothriomyrmex. Described by Emery in 1869, the species is endemic to Italy.
