= Bothriomyrmex urartus =

Scientific classification
- Kingdom: Animalia
- Phylum: Arthropoda
- Class: Insecta
- Order: Hymenoptera
- Family: Formicidae
- Subfamily: Dolichoderinae
- Genus: Bothriomyrmex
- Species: B. urartus

Binomial name
- Bothriomyrmex urartus Dubovikov, 2002

Species of ant

Bothriomyrmex urartus is a species of ant in the genus Bothriomyrmex. Described by Dubovikov in 2002, the species is endemic to Armenia.
