= Bothriomyrmex meridionalis =

Scientific classification
- Domain: Eukaryota
- Kingdom: Animalia
- Phylum: Arthropoda
- Class: Insecta
- Order: Hymenoptera
- Family: Formicidae
- Subfamily: Dolichoderinae
- Genus: Bothriomyrmex
- Species: B. meridionalis

Binomial name
- Bothriomyrmex meridionalis (Roger, 1863)

Subspecies
- Bothriomyrmex meridionalis hungaricus Röszler, 1942; Bothriomyrmex meridionalis marocanus Santschi, 1923

Synonyms
- Bothriomyrmex meridionalis hispanicus Santschi, 1922

Species of ant

Bothriomyrmex meridionalis is a species of ant in the genus Bothriomyrmex. Described by Roger in 1863, the species is widespread in various European countries and also in Africa, including Algeria, Bulgaria, Croatia, France, Georgia, Montenegro, Romania, Slovakia and Spain.
