= Bothriomyrmex jannonei =

Scientific classification
- Domain: Eukaryota
- Kingdom: Animalia
- Phylum: Arthropoda
- Class: Insecta
- Order: Hymenoptera
- Family: Formicidae
- Subfamily: Dolichoderinae
- Genus: Bothriomyrmex
- Species: B. jannonei

Binomial name
- Bothriomyrmex jannonei Menozzi, 1936

Species of ant

Bothriomyrmex jannonei is a species of ant in the genus Bothriomyrmex. Described by Menozzi in 1936, the species is endemic to Greece.
