= Bothriomyrmex syrius =

Scientific classification
- Domain: Eukaryota
- Kingdom: Animalia
- Phylum: Arthropoda
- Class: Insecta
- Order: Hymenoptera
- Family: Formicidae
- Subfamily: Dolichoderinae
- Genus: Bothriomyrmex
- Species: B. syrius

Binomial name
- Bothriomyrmex syrius Forel, 1910

Species of ant

Bothriomyrmex syrius is a species of ant in the genus Bothriomyrmex. Described by Forel in 1910, the species is endemic to Greece, Israel, Lebanon and Montenegro.
