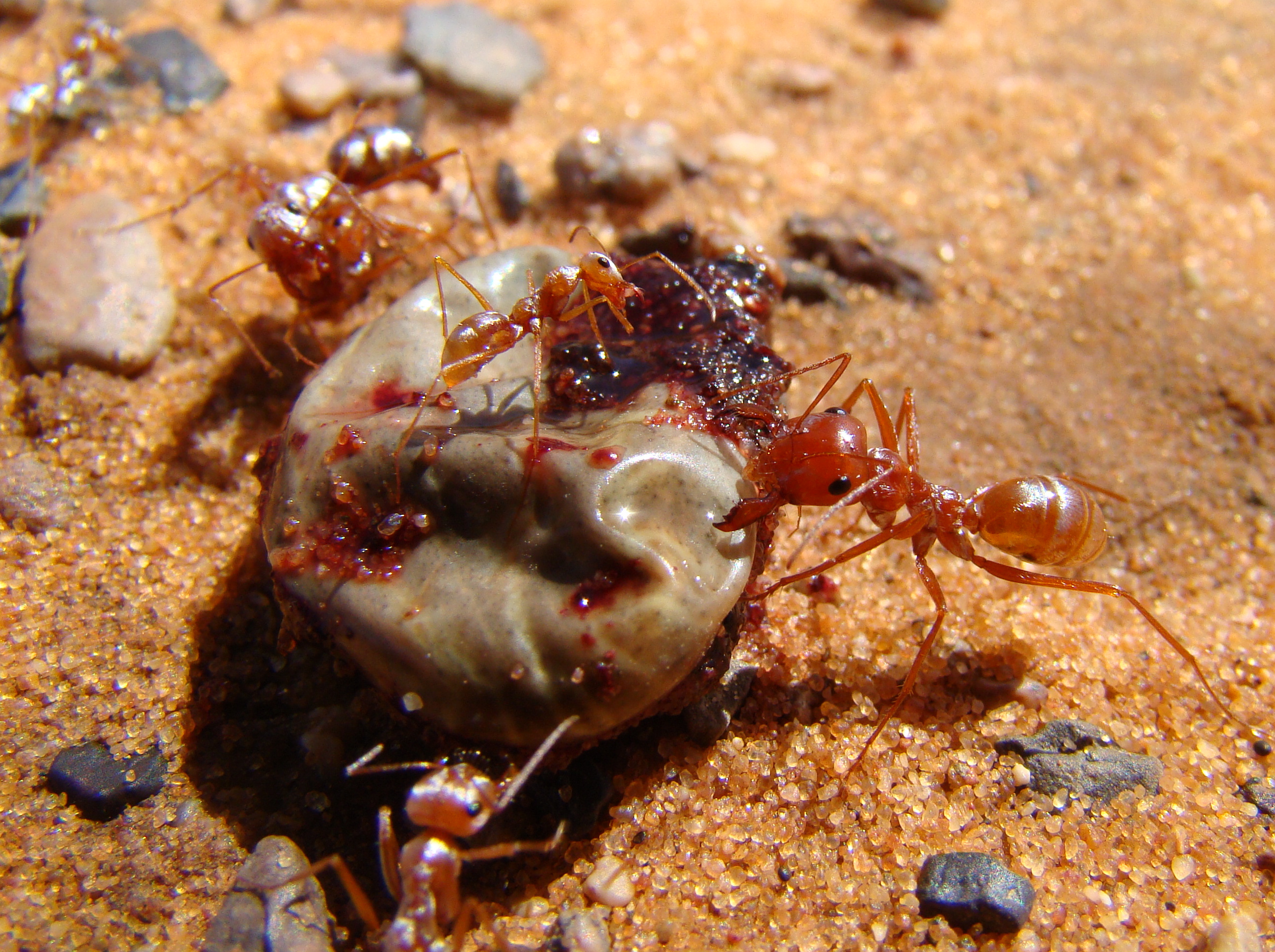

Scientific classification
- Kingdom: Animalia
- Phylum: Arthropoda
- Clade: Pancrustacea
- Class: Insecta
- Order: Hymenoptera
- Family: Formicidae
- Subfamily: Formicinae
- Genus: Cataglyphis
- Species: C. bombycina

Binomial name
- Cataglyphis bombycina Roger, 1859

= Saharan silver ant =

Species of ant

The Saharan silver ant (Cataglyphis bombycina) is a species of insect that lives in the Sahara Desert. It is the fastest of the world's 12,000 known ant species, clocking a velocity of 855 millimetres per second (over 1.9 miles per hour or 3.1 kilometres per hour). It can travel a length 108 times its own body length per second, a feat topped only by two other creatures, the Australian tiger beetle Rivacindela hudsoni and the California coastal mite Paratarsotomus macropalpis. This is nearly the walking pace of a human being, and compared to its body size would correspond to a speed of about 200 m/s (720 km/h) for a 180 cm (6 ft) tall human runner.

Largely due to the extremely high temperatures of their habitat, but also due to the threat of predators, the ants are active outside their nest for only about ten minutes per day. The twin pressures of predation and temperature restrict their above-ground activity to within a narrow temperature band between that at which predatory lizards cease activity and the ants' own upper threshold.

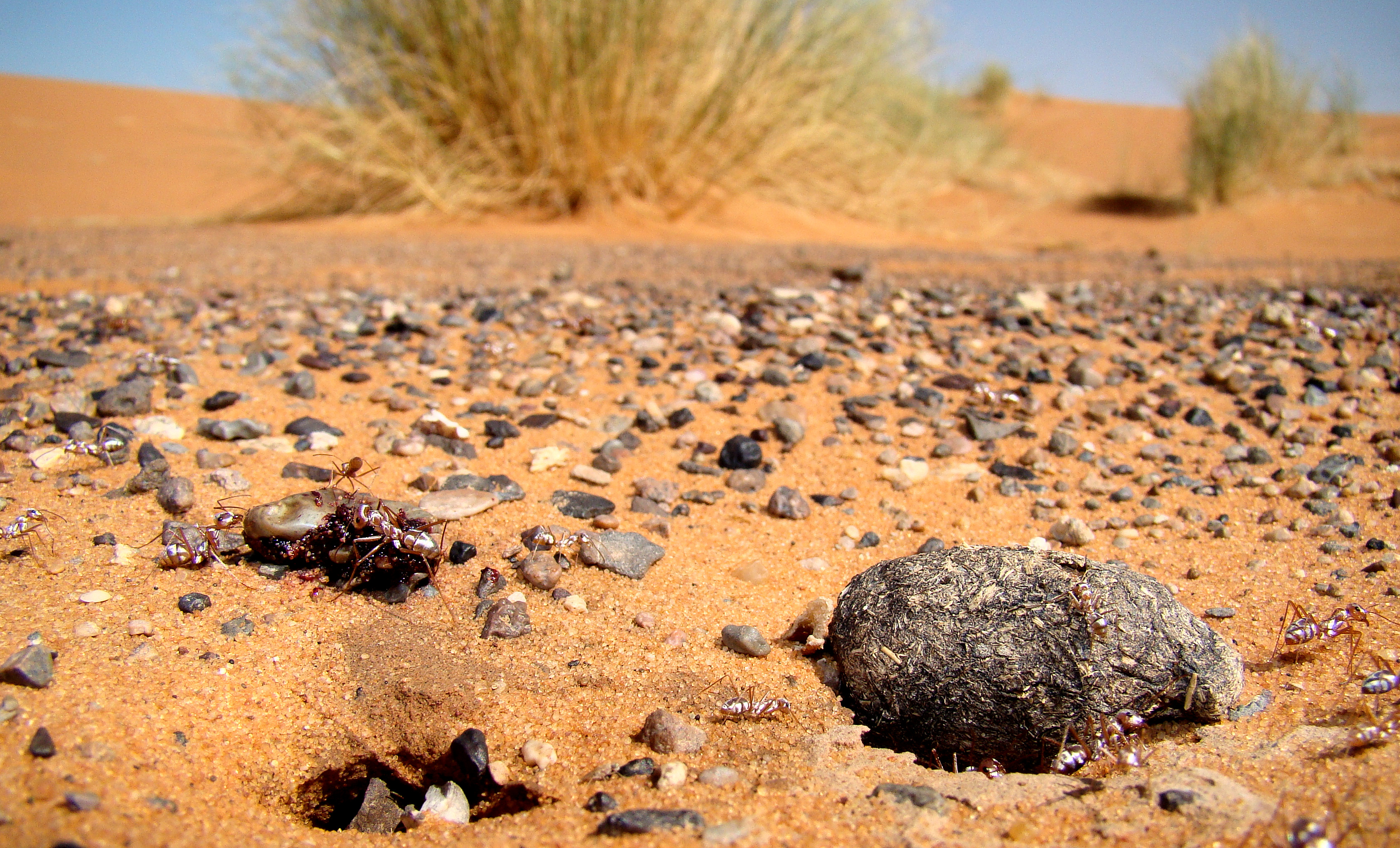
The scene outside a Saharan silver ant nest

The ants often traverse midday temperatures around 47 °C (117 °F) to scavenge corpses of heat-stricken animals. To cope with such high temperatures, the ants have several unique adaptations.

When traveling at full speed, they use only four of their six legs. This quadrupedal gait is achieved by raising the front pair of legs. Several other adaptations, including a very high stride frequency, make C. bombycina one of the fastest-walking animal species in relation to their body size.

Keeping track of the position of the sun, the ants are able to navigate, always knowing the direct route back to their nest, thus can minimize their time spent in the heat. A few scouts keep watch and alert the colony when ant-eating lizards take shelter in their burrows. Then the whole colony, hundreds of ants, leaves to search for food, although they need to complete their work before the temperature reaches 53 °C (127 °F), a temperature capable of killing them.

Saharan silver ants produce heat shock proteins (HSPs), but unlike other animals, they do this not in direct response to heat. Instead, they do this before leaving the nest, so they do not suffer the initial damage when their body temperature rises quickly. These HSPs allow cellular functions to continue even at very high body temperatures. If they did not produce the proteins in anticipation of the extreme heat, they would die before the proteins could have their effect.

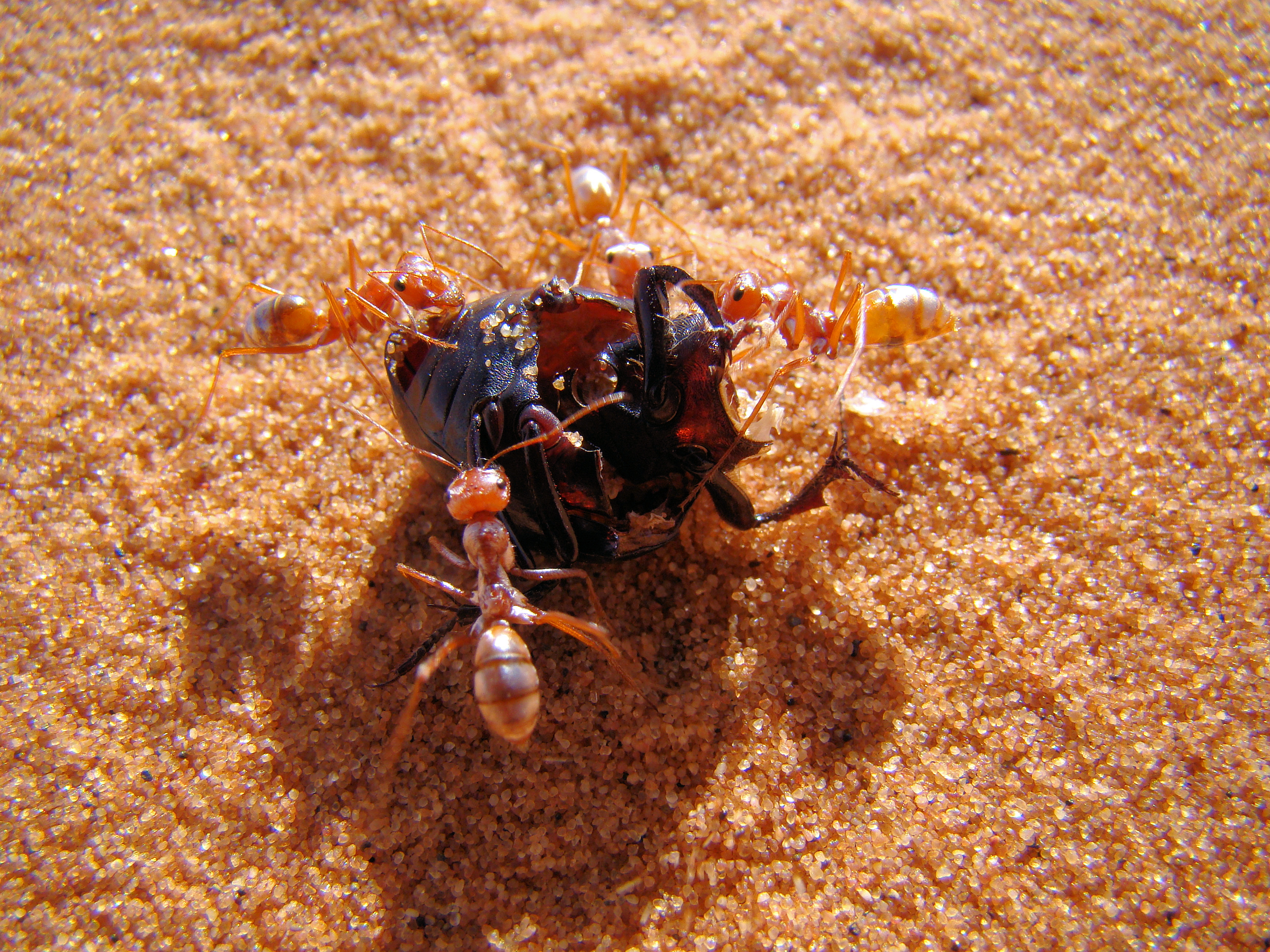
Saharan silver ants capturing desert beetle

In the words of one researcher, the production of this protein "does not reflect an acute response to cellular injury or protein denaturation, but appears to be an adaptive response allowing the organism to perform work at elevated temperatures during temperature changes too abrupt to give the animal an opportunity to benefit from de novo HSP synthesis," further "the few minutes duration of the foraging frenzy is too short for synthesis of these protective proteins after exposure to heat." This and other adaptations led to the ant being called "one of the most heat-resistant animals known." Its critical thermal maximum is 53.6 °C (128.5 °F).

Silver ants are covered on the top and sides of their bodies with a coating of uniquely shaped hairs with triangular cross-sections that keep them cool in two ways. These hairs are highly reflective under visible and near-infrared light, i.e., in the region of maximal solar radiation. The hairs are also highly emissive in the midinfrared portion of the electromagnetic spectrum, where they serve as an antireflection layer that enhances the ants' ability to offload excess heat by thermal radiation, which is emitted from the hot body of the ants to the air. This passive cooling effect works under the full sun. For this, they have inspired research in the field of passive daytime radiative cooling.
