= Bothriomyrmex kusnezovi =

Scientific classification
- Domain: Eukaryota
- Kingdom: Animalia
- Phylum: Arthropoda
- Class: Insecta
- Order: Hymenoptera
- Family: Formicidae
- Subfamily: Dolichoderinae
- Genus: Bothriomyrmex
- Species: B. kusnezovi

Binomial name
- Bothriomyrmex kusnezovi Emery, 1925

Species of ant

Bothriomyrmex kusnezovi is a species of ant in the genus Bothriomyrmex. Described by Emery in 1925, the species is endemic to China, Kazakhstan and Kyrgyzstan.
