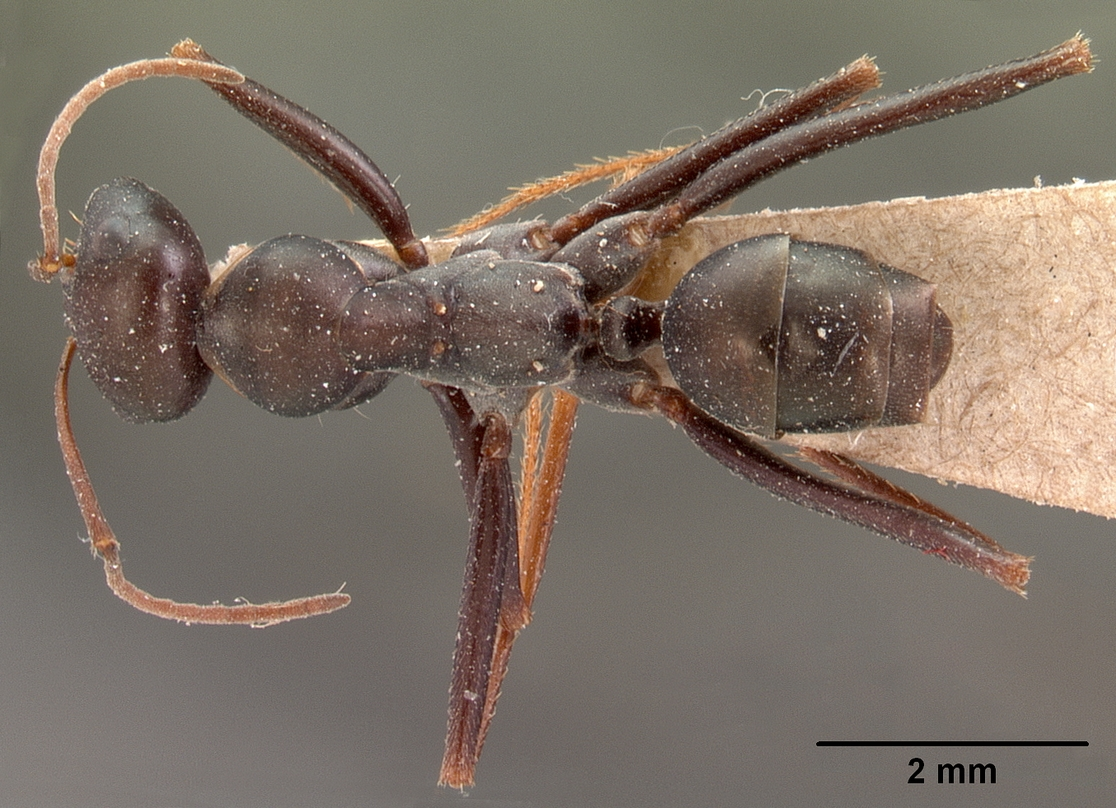
- Cataglyphis cursor subsp. creticus worker

Scientific classification
- Kingdom: Animalia
- Phylum: Arthropoda
- Clade: Pancrustacea
- Class: Insecta
- Order: Hymenoptera
- Family: Formicidae
- Subfamily: Formicinae
- Genus: Cataglyphis
- Species: C. cursor

Binomial name
- Cataglyphis cursor (Fonscolombe, 1846)

= Cataglyphis cursor =

Species of ant

Cataglyphis cursor is a species of ant in the genus Cataglyphis. Described in 1846, it is known only from the Mediterranean parts of France.

== Reproduction ==
Parthenogenesis is a natural form of reproduction in which growth and development of embryos occur without fertilization. Thelytoky is a particular form of parthenogenesis in which the development of a female individual occurs from an unfertilized egg. Automixis is a form of thelytoky, but there are several kinds of automixis. The kind of automixis relevant here is one in which two haploid products from the same meiosis combine to form a diploid zygote.

Central fusion and terminal fusion automixis

The process of automictic thelytoky with central fusion has been studied in C. cursor. Central fusion allows heterozygosity to be largely maintained. Queen ants use this process to produce female reproductive progeny (gynes), thus increasing the transmission of their own genes through the germline lineage. Also, queens use sexual reproduction to produce worker ants. In C. cursor colonies with a single queen, 96.4% of daughter queens arise from thelytokous parthenogenetic eggs, while 97.9% of daughter workers arise from fertilized eggs.

== Subspecies ==
Besides the type subspecies, the following three are recognized:

- Cataglyphis cursor subsp. aterrimus Pisarski, 1967
- Cataglyphis cursor subsp. creticus (Forel, 1910)
- Cataglyphis cursor subsp. rockingeri (Forel, 1911)
