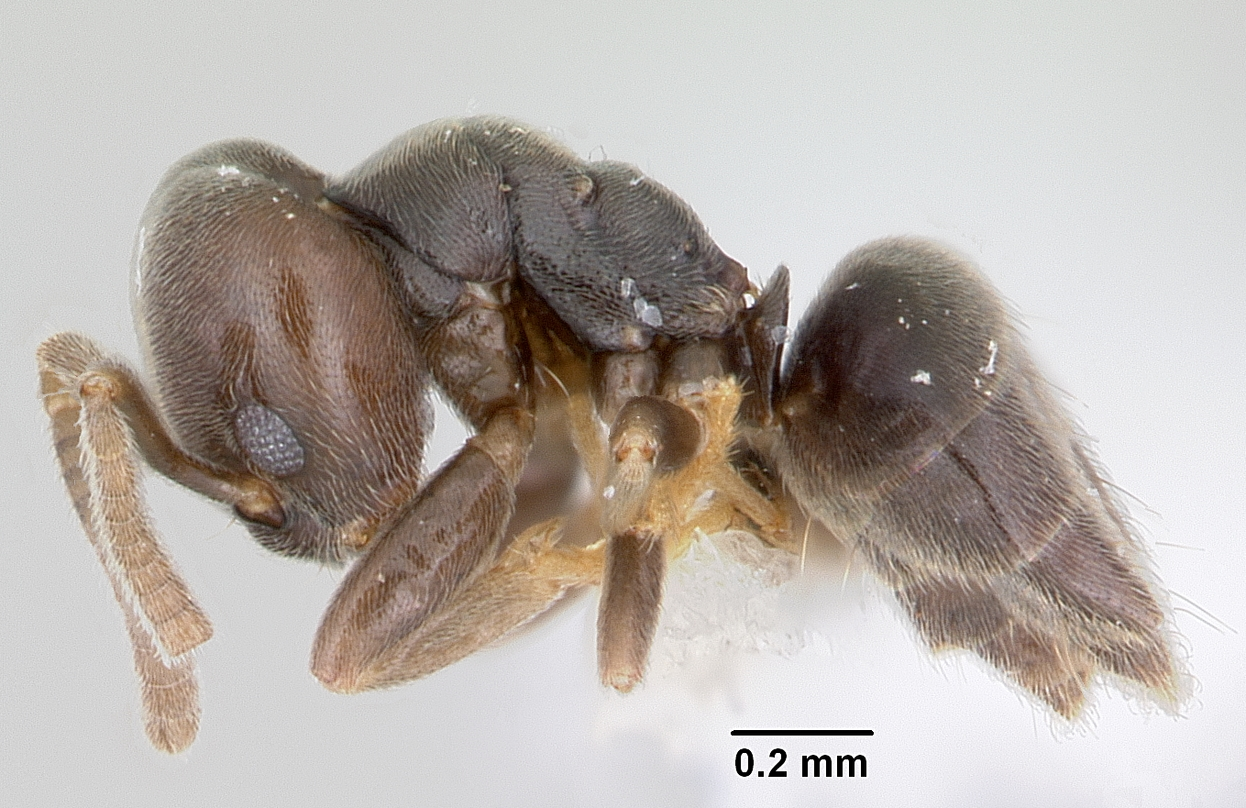
- Bothriomyrmex paradoxus worker from Costa Rica

Scientific classification
- Domain: Eukaryota
- Kingdom: Animalia
- Phylum: Arthropoda
- Class: Insecta
- Order: Hymenoptera
- Family: Formicidae
- Subfamily: Dolichoderinae
- Genus: Bothriomyrmex
- Species: B. paradoxus

Binomial name
- Bothriomyrmex paradoxus Dubovikov & Longino, 2004

= Bothriomyrmex paradoxus =

Species of ant

Bothriomyrmex paradoxus is a species of ant in the genus Bothriomyrmex. Described by Dubovikov and Longino in 2004, the species is endemic to Costa Rica and Honduras.
