= Bothriomyrmex salsurae =

Scientific classification
- Domain: Eukaryota
- Kingdom: Animalia
- Phylum: Arthropoda
- Class: Insecta
- Order: Hymenoptera
- Family: Formicidae
- Subfamily: Dolichoderinae
- Genus: Bothriomyrmex
- Species: B. salsurae

Binomial name
- Bothriomyrmex salsurae Donisthorpe, 1944

Species of ant

Bothriomyrmex salsurae is a species of ant in the genus Bothriomyrmex. Described by Donisthorpe in 1944, the species is endemic to Algeria.
