= Bothriomyrmex turcomenicus =

Scientific classification
- Domain: Eukaryota
- Kingdom: Animalia
- Phylum: Arthropoda
- Class: Insecta
- Order: Hymenoptera
- Family: Formicidae
- Subfamily: Dolichoderinae
- Genus: Bothriomyrmex
- Species: B. turcomenicus

Binomial name
- Bothriomyrmex turcomenicus Emery, 1925

Species of ant

Bothriomyrmex turcomenicus is a species of ant in the genus Bothriomyrmex. Described by Emery in 1925, the species is endemic to Kazakhstan, Turkey and Turkmenistan.
