= Moitrelia boeticella =

Scientific classification
- Domain: Eukaryota
- Kingdom: Animalia
- Phylum: Arthropoda
- Class: Insecta
- Order: Lepidoptera
- Family: Pyralidae
- Genus: Moitrelia
- Species: M. boeticella

Binomial name
- Moitrelia boeticella (Ragonot, 1887)

Synonyms
- Pempelia boeticella Ragonot, 1887; Pempeliella boeticella; Pempelia multifidella Chrétien, 1911

Species of moth

Moitrelia boeticella is a species of snout moth. It is found in Spain and North Africa, including Tunisia.

The wingspan is about 20 mm.
