= Cataglyphis hannae =

Conservation status
- Vulnerable (IUCN 2.3)

Scientific classification
- Kingdom: Animalia
- Phylum: Arthropoda
- Class: Insecta
- Order: Hymenoptera
- Family: Formicidae
- Subfamily: Formicinae
- Genus: Cataglyphis
- Species: C. hannae

Binomial name
- Cataglyphis hannae Agosti, 1994

Species of ant

Cataglyphis hannae is a species of ant in the subfamily Formicinae. It is native to Tunisia.
