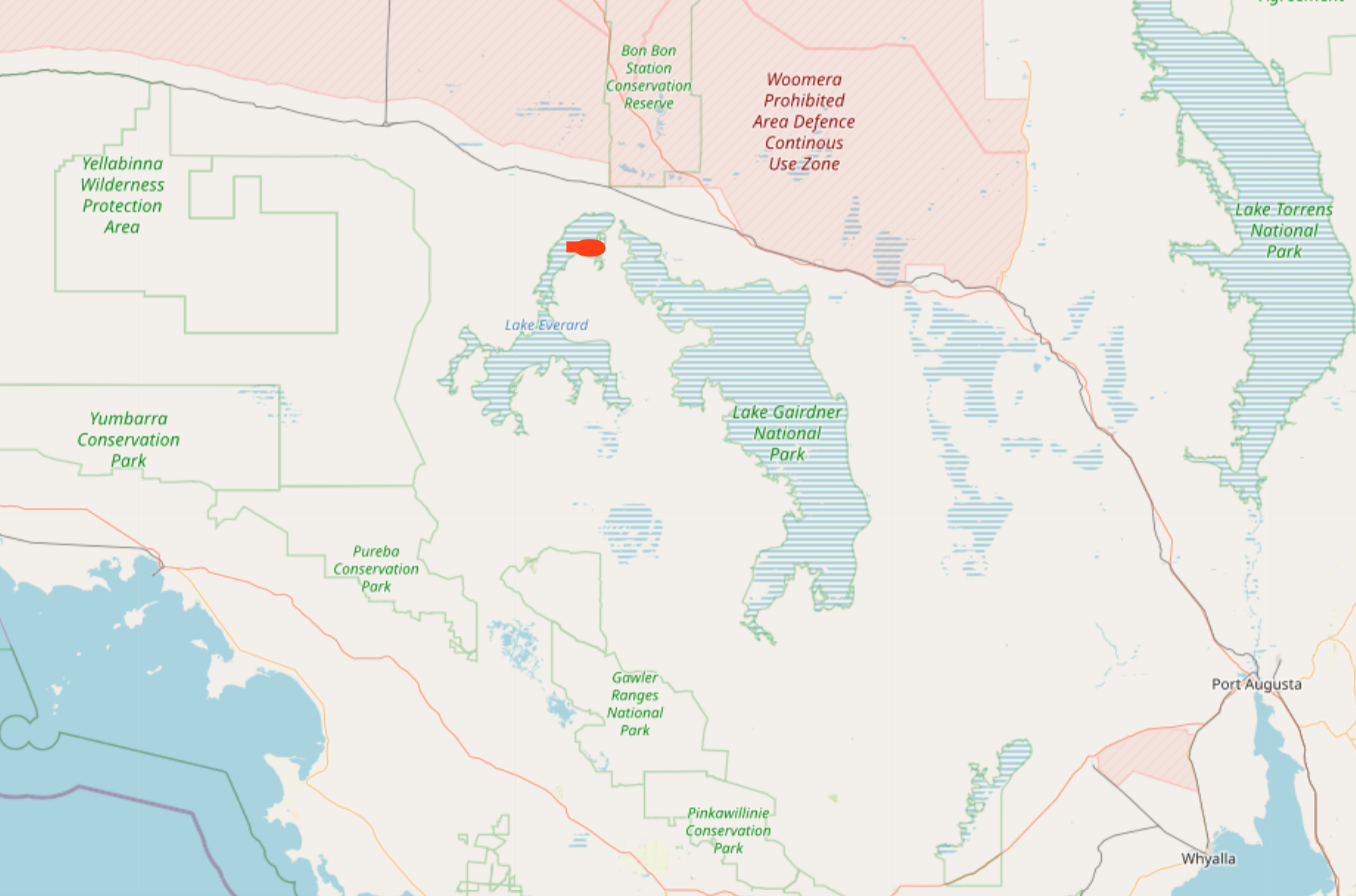
- R. hudsoni sighting in South Australia

Scientific classification
- Kingdom: Animalia
- Phylum: Arthropoda
- Clade: Pancrustacea
- Class: Insecta
- Order: Coleoptera
- Suborder: Adephaga
- Family: Cicindelidae
- Genus: Rivacindela
- Species: R. hudsoni

Binomial name
- Rivacindela hudsoni (Sumlin, 1997)

= Rivacindela hudsoni =

Rivacindela hudsoni Temporal range: aptian–present

Species of beetle

Rivacindela hudsoni is an Australian species of the family Cicindelinae or tiger beetles and is the fastest running insect. The genus Rivacindela is contentiously treated as a subgenus of the broader Cicindela and are typically found in salty habitats such as dry salt lakes and salt streams. The species was discovered in South Australia and described in 1997, with an adult form of approximately 20–21mm in length and a running speed of 2.49 m/s, or 120 body lengths per second.

== Habitat ==
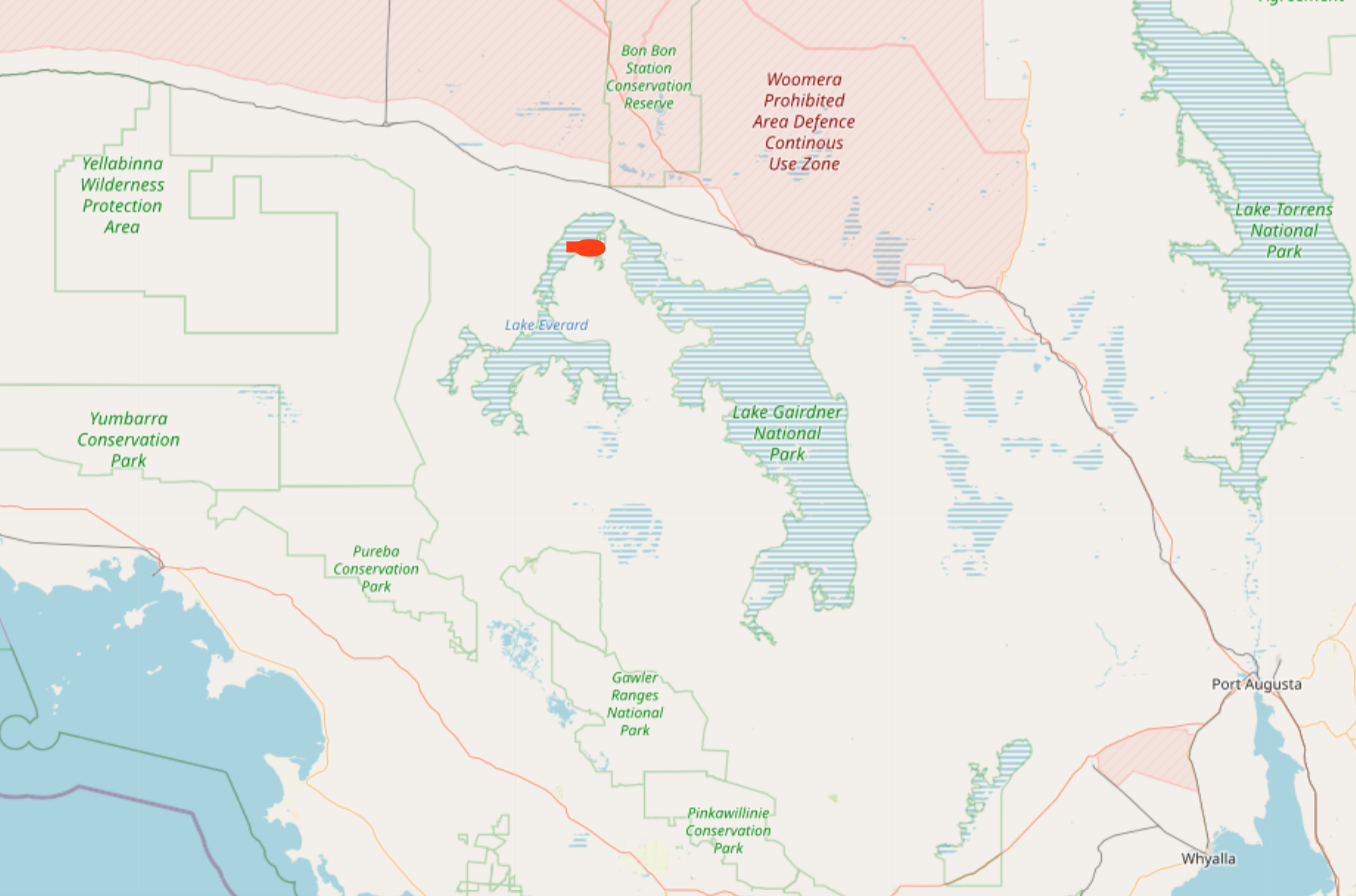
Location of Rivacindela hudsoni sighting.

Saline bodies of water are the most common habitat for Australian tiger beetles as they form a sort of haven for the insects which are surrounded by vast, arid deserts that cannot energetically support them. Rivacindela as a genus is endemic to the Australian Eyrean region and its isolated evolution in this area gave the species its propensity for high speeds which have been shown to increase at higher surface temperatures. The beetle was first recorded at 31°05'40.0"S 135°19'30.0"E by Sumlin in 1997.

== Life history ==
=== Egg ===
The first life stage of Rivacindela hudsoni is its egg form, inside of which the embryo develops. Although a developmental period is not yet clearly described for this species due to its recent discovery, it can be inferred to be anywhere from 9 to 29 days when following the general trends of the family Cicindelinae.

=== Larva ===
Once hatched, the organism is in its larval stage. Here, the Rivacindela hudsoni is white and grub-like with two tagmata (specialized body segments): the head and pronotum. Both of these segments are highly chitinized, meaning there is a strong exoskeleton covering the larva which will be shed for metamorphosis and growth to occur. On its lower back, the larva has a pair of large, forward-facing hooks, used to anchor the larva to the environment around itself. Further, it has mandibles under the eyes to capture prey. Not much is known of the pupal stage, as, in the same manner as all members of the Cicindelinae family, this stage of its life is completed entirely underground, since the larvae have to ability to make tunnels. This stage can take anywhere from three to 30 days.

All tiger beetle larvae are relatively similar as they spend their upbringing in the same environment: dark burrows. They resemble grubs with a white body and dark capsule. One defining feature is evident on their lower back where they have two pairs of large hooks used to pull oblivious prey into the burrow. They reside in burrows that range in ecological conditions; some are located in flatter land masses; others include clay banks or even a pile of rotting leaves. The burrow not only is a great place for larvae to await prey, but also for them to quickly retreat in times of danger.

==== Larval hunting ====
Once the larvae of the Rivacindela hudsoni hatch from the egg, they dig and reside in tunnels, anchoring themselves to the substrate via the pair of hooks on its back. It is here that they move through their three larval developmental stages known as instars. At the end of each instar, the organism moults its chitinized outer layer in order to grow. These stages of growth are facilitated by the energy gained through the larvae's sedentary predatory behaviour.

At this stage of its life, the Rivacindela hudsoni hunts using an ambush method of attack as it lies in wait for its arthropod prey to move in range of its mandibles. Once the prey is in range, the larvae extends its body out of the burrow, grabs the organism with its mandibles and drags it back into the tunnel where it proceeds to kill and eat it. At the end of the third instar, the larvae remain in a chamber situated in the depths of the burrow in which they pupate after blocking the tunnel's entrance. Once the metamorphosis is complete, the adults dig out of the ground to begin the next stage of their lives.

==== Larva diet ====
Similar to how body size correlates with habitat choice, it also relates to the size of prey they choose. Studies showed that low feeding levels can create significant implications on tiger beetle development, more specifically for larvae. Because of the increased susceptibility and risk of parasitism for larvae, long-term exposure to low feeding levels can greatly increase mortality rate. This is especially worrisome as the vulnerable larval foraging stages are extended when feeding levels are low. Furthermore, the consequences of these low feeding levels can manifest as a domino effect and extend to later stages throughout the life cycle, which result in underdeveloped pupae and adults. Insufficient feeding at a young age can impact the reproductive potential of adult females who similarly experience low feeding levels.

=== Adult ===
Like all insects, the Rivacindela hudsoni has three tagmata in its adult form. These segments include the head, abdomen, and a patterned thorax onto which six thin, uniramous appendages and two pairs of vestigial wings are attached. The beetle's forewings are hardened to form a protective layer known as the elytra and are fused to the hindwings. The species has two large eyes that together make the head wider than the thorax, underneath which a pair of filiform antennae are attached. Surrounding the mouth is the labrum, onto which sharp projections and maxillae are attached next to a pair of sickle-like mandibles with both compound and simple teeth arranged along its length. The average body length of R. hudsoni is recorded at 20.8 mm.

==== Adult hunting ====
Adult Rivacindela hudsoni are diurnal, meaning they are active during the day with a period of rest and/or inactivity at night. The hunting practices of these predatory flightless beetles are highly specialized due to the shift from bimodal locomotory status to a unimodal locomotory status, meaning the loss of flight and reduction to only running. They have been observed to run in a zig-zag pattern which is closely followed by long, fast straight lines. When running straight, the R. hudsoni were observed to run faster than any other recorded insect at 2.5 m/s or 125 body lengths every second. However, it has been observed that at high speeds, tiger beetles experience temporary blindness when chasing prey. This is because the beetle cannot gather enough photons that reflect its prey to form an image of it, resulting in a stop-start mode of hunting made affordable by its high speeds. As a predator living in dry, saline environments, the R. hudsoni eats almost anything it can capture such as other beetles, caterpillars and ants while also taking advantage of other, larger meals as scavengers. Their feeding practices are not just to consume their prey whole. The beetles will slowly break down the prey's cuticle to gain access to the soft, internal parts of its body.

== Mating ==
When a male R. hudsoni desires to mate, he will search for and chase a female displaying foraging behaviors such as intermittent sprints. In the chase, males are often seen mounting both males and females of any species in an attempt to copulate. Once he has sufficiently decreased the distance between himself and his target, he will leap onto the female's back, grabbing her thorax with his mandibles and her wings with his front two sets of legs. This mating strategy is known as amplexus. At this point, the female has the opportunity to exercise her choice over her mate as in most observed cases, the mounted female will attempt to remove the male by jumping, bucking and running around. This behavior is believed to be used for discerning the agility and strength of the male, allowing the female to mate with only those who rank high in those categories. After copulation, the male will maintain his mounted position for a longer than necessary length of time to deter or completely inhibit another male from mating with the same female. It has been shown that for some species of Cicindelinae, actual copulation accounted for only 2.3% of the time spent in the amplexus. This allows him to ensure his sperm will be the one to fertilize the female's egg. Studies have shown that the length of this amplexus is a determining factor of the distance between the mating site and oviposition.

When the female is ready, she will lay her eggs individually in a carefully chosen substrate. The hairs on her thorax help her to determine the eligibility of the soil as a burrow for her eggs as they allow her to detect its composition and quality. The female R. hudsoni's decision (as with all members of the Cicindelinae family) is dependent on a number of factors: soil temperature, soil type, salinity, moisture, and vegetation cover. She expends the energy to do this as the burrow she lays her egg in will be used by the resultant larvae for all stages of its development, and thus her choice in oviposition will be a determining factor in the larvae's survival. Once she has found a suitable spot, she uses her ovipositor which extends from her thorax to dig burrows in which she deposits an egg before refilling it with soil.

== Physiology ==
Due to the R. hudsoni's habitat being hot and dry, they rely on high resting metabolic rates to maintain optimal body temperatures at all times. This is important as running speed is positively correlated with body temperature and therefore aids the beetles in prey capture. This, combined with the length ratio of their femur and tibia, and the slender nature of the beetle's legs is what allows them to run so quickly across substrates. While many of their specific internal structures have not been studied thoroughly, scientists have compiled a decent amount of research on tiger beetles' digestive and nervous system.

=== Running ===
The legs are formed in 6 pieces. They have femora, tibiae, protarsi, and mesotarsi and metatarsi. They often have a strange way of running. Due to their lack of flight, the beetles often hunt and escape erratically. The beetle functions by doing short sprints, waiting, and then sprinting again. This allows them to catch up to the prey or get away from a predator more effectively. This partially functions as a form of ambush predation.

=== Flight ===
Out of the total of 30 tiger beetle species out of the Rivacindela subgenus, nine have displayed flightless behavior due to their incompletely developed and abnormally small wings. Flightlessness in Cicindelidae has evolved at different points in time and to varying degrees within the lineage. The rapid ground movement of the species has enabled them to hold the record for fastest running speed ever seen out of any insect. Evidence suggests a relationship between their flightlessness behavior and residing in isolated and stable environments.

To fully understand the transition between bimodal moving, which involves bought flying and running, to a unimodal model, only involves running, it is important to understand the importance of these functions and how they have originated and evolved in response to certain environmental factors and predator-prey relationships. Usually, flight is preferred when needing to escape from predation in order to buy time to remain more prepared about the location and size of the predator. However, the species was observed to combine flight with small hops when facing predator and approaching prey. In addition, flight can be a crucial aspect in thermoregulation: beetles can cool their body to prevent overheating and also find basking sites.

Several hypotheses have been created to better assess how flightlessness evolved. Besides stability of their habitat, other possible explanations include the high energy cost of flying, as well as social and parasitic behavior. Research studies in regions such as Northern Europe and the West Indies has linked the frequency of tiger beetles with smaller wings to the likelihood of them residing in isolated regions like open forest areas, salt lakes, and mountains.

=== Vision ===
Tiger beetles have interesting visual processing and image perception due to their small, flat, simple structured eyes. This helps in bright environments.

=== Thermoregulation ===
In the high temperatures of the Australian desert, the adult R. hudsoni spends up to 56% of its daily activity regulating its body temperature. The time expended on this is determined by the number of available prey. External tactics of thermoregulation observed include burrowing in cooler, wetter substrates, remaining still in shaded areas or shifting in and out of the shade throughout the day in an attempt to maintain an optimal body temperature of approximately 35°C. Internally, the family Cicindelinae approach thermoregulation convectively as they "stilt" on their legs to optimize the positioning of their body above a higher heat boundary. Concurrently, they orient their bodies in the direction of the sun to reduce the surface area of their body that is exposed to direct heat.

Larvae use their burrow turrets as a thermoregulatory technique. Being only 2 cm above the ground's surface to rise above the heat boundary in the same fashion as the adult's 'stilt' allows the larvae to be continuously active throughout the day. In extreme cases such as high heat, the larvae will completely block their burrow and retreat to its depths.

=== Digestion ===
As carnivores, tiger beetles lack the complex digestive system herbivore insects need to break down cellulose and extract/absorb plant nutrients. Instead, their digestive system is broken down into three sections from mouth to anus.

When eating, the R. hudsoni masticates food with their mandibles and pre-oral mill. They utilize their mandibular glands in this process which secrete saliva across their teeth and mandibles. Once the beetle's meal passes this point, the food must travel through the three sections of the beetle's digestive system. The first section is the foregut which is constituted by a crop, proventriculus and esophagus. The beetle's midgut is surrounded by 'regenerative crypts' of epithelial cells that are constantly replacing dead cells in this section of the gut. The function of the midgut is to connect the foregut to the hindgut, which consists of the intestine and the rectum.

R. hudsoni, like all tiger beetles, are fluid feeders. This means they cannot consume and digest solids. To prevent this, the beetle's hypopharyngeal membrane and epipharyngeal flap are covered by setae. These hair-like structures point downwards and act as a filter to prevent any solid parts of the meal from entering the digestive tract. Some studies have indicated that there is a possibility of extra-oral digestion in Cicindelinae, which would mean they regurgitate gut enzymes to break down food further in their mouths before it continues through to the foregut. However, there is currently no complete evidence for this functionality.

=== Reproduction ===
The female R. hudsoni has gonads (or reproductive gland) that consist of two ovaries made of 8-30 tubes known as ovarioles. These tubes converge to make two oviducts which in turn combine into a single oviduct. Other parts of this system include the vagina and spermatheca where the sperm is stored within the female. The eighth and ninth sections of a female's abdomen are combined to form a telescopic ovipositor which she uses to deposit her eggs in a substrate once fertilized.

The male R. hudsoni has both internal and external reproductive organs. The external organ is known as the aedeagus, which is the arthropod form of the penis. On the inner wall of the aedeagus sits the endophallus and inside this is the male's flagellum which is received by the female's spermatheca during mating procedures.

=== Predation ===
Since the majority of the species are earthbound, adult tiger beetles sprint in small bursts and occasionally slow down or stop because they run so fast to the point they can't clearly pinpoint prey. As they stop, they scan the area to detect any movement, and once they see potential prey, they quickly chase it down and grabs it with its sickle-shaped mandible. Tiger beetles consume prey by breaking it down into a puree through proteolytic enzymes they release. In addition, a tobacco-like fluid is released as a defense mechanism to aid this process. Any remaining indigestible parts of the prey such as dry cuticles are expelled.
