= Cataglyphis fortis =

Scientific classification
- Kingdom: Animalia
- Phylum: Arthropoda
- Class: Insecta
- Order: Hymenoptera
- Family: Formicidae
- Subfamily: Formicinae
- Genus: Cataglyphis
- Species: C. fortis

Binomial name
- Cataglyphis fortis (Forel, 1902)

Species of ant

Cataglyphis fortis is a species of ant in the subfamily Formicinae. Found in Tunisia, the ants inhabit salt pans where they forage dead arthropods.

== Navigation skills and internal pedometer ==
=== Measuring the sun's angle ===
This ant ventures far from its burrow in the Sahara Desert, which has almost no identifiable features. While venturing out it periodically takes measurements of its angle in respect to the Sun. By doing this the ant can venture far from its nest in search of food. Because of the blistering heat, it can only do this for about 3–5 minutes/day (the hottest time of the day, when all its predators are in hiding from the sun). When the ant finds a dead insect it then looks at the sun and because of its periodic references to the sun's angle it knows exactly what the shortest route back to the nest is. Researchers from the Max Planck Institute for Chemical Ecology have also verified that desert microhabitats have unique odour signatures that can guide the ants back to the nest.

This skill, which has also been observed in the behavior of foraging honey bees, is elemental to the survival of this species of ant under the harsh conditions in which it lives. This behavior allows Cataglyphis to travel farther from its nest than any other creature that lives in the Sahara, with respect to size.

=== Pedometer ===
The ant appears to use an internal pedometer to count its steps in a harsh environment where odors quickly vanish, enabling it to "count back" to its nest. When stilts were glued on to the ants legs, they overshot the distance of their nests, while ants with cut legs traveled short of their nest. It's suspected that while the ants unlikely have the brainpower to literally count steps, they are somehow doing it intuitively.

=== Food memory ===
Cataglyphis fortis is capable, as well, of memorizing up to 14 different food odors which seemingly exceeds its requirements for survival. Workers from a colony were presented with several different food odors and were observed to remember them for up to 25 days following their initial introduction to the odor, which exceeds the average expected lifespan of about six days before they tend to be killed by predators. Researchers were consequentially stunned that ants who had reached over four times the average expected age could still remember what they learned. Puzzled at this, they reasoned that it makes sense due to food being unpredictable, and the ants may come across several different food items in a single foraging run while nest scents tend to remain the same and will not drastically change during any given ant's lifetime.
