= Felix Santschi =

Swiss entomologist

Felix Santschi (1 December 1872 – 20 November 1940) was a Swiss entomologist known for discovering that ants use the sun as a compass and for describing about 2000 taxa of ants.

Santschi is known for his pioneering work on the navigational abilities of ants. In one experiment, he investigated the way harvester ants used the sky to navigate. He found that as long as even a small patch of sky was visible, the ants could return directly to the nest after gathering food. However, when the sky was completely hidden, they lost their sense of direction and began moving haphazardly. Some seventy years later it was shown that ants are guided by the polarization of light.
