= Passaliolla cossonoides =

Scientific classification
- Kingdom: Animalia
- Phylum: Arthropoda
- Clade: Pancrustacea
- Class: Insecta
- Order: Coleoptera
- Suborder: Polyphaga
- Infraorder: Scarabaeiformia
- Family: Scarabaeidae
- Genus: Passaliolla
- Species: P. cossonoides

Binomial name
- Passaliolla cossonoides (Bates, 1887)

Synonyms
- Saprosites cossonoides Bates, 1887

Species of beetle

Passaliolla cossonoides is a species of beetle of the family Scarabaeidae. It is found in Costa Rica, Guatemala, Honduras, Mexico (Chiapas, Veracruz), Panama and Peru.

== Description ==
Adults reach a length of about 2.9–3.2 mm (0.11–0.13 in). They are similar to Passaliolla corticalis in shape of the pronotum and elytra.

== Life history ==
They inhabit tropical evergreen forests. Specimens have been found under bark.
