= Haroldiataenius buvexus =

Scientific classification
- Kingdom: Animalia
- Phylum: Arthropoda
- Clade: Pancrustacea
- Class: Insecta
- Order: Coleoptera
- Suborder: Polyphaga
- Infraorder: Scarabaeiformia
- Family: Scarabaeidae
- Genus: Haroldiataenius
- Species: H. buvexus

Binomial name
- Haroldiataenius buvexus Stebnicka & Skelley, 2009

Species of beetle

Haroldiataenius buvexus is a species of beetle of the family Scarabaeidae. It is found in the United States (Texas).

== Description ==
Adults reach a length of about 3.9–4.1 mm (0.15–0.16 in). They have a dark brown to black, shining body.

== Etymology ==
The species name is derived from Latin bu- (meaning large) and convexus, in reference to the similarity with Haroldiataenius convexus.
