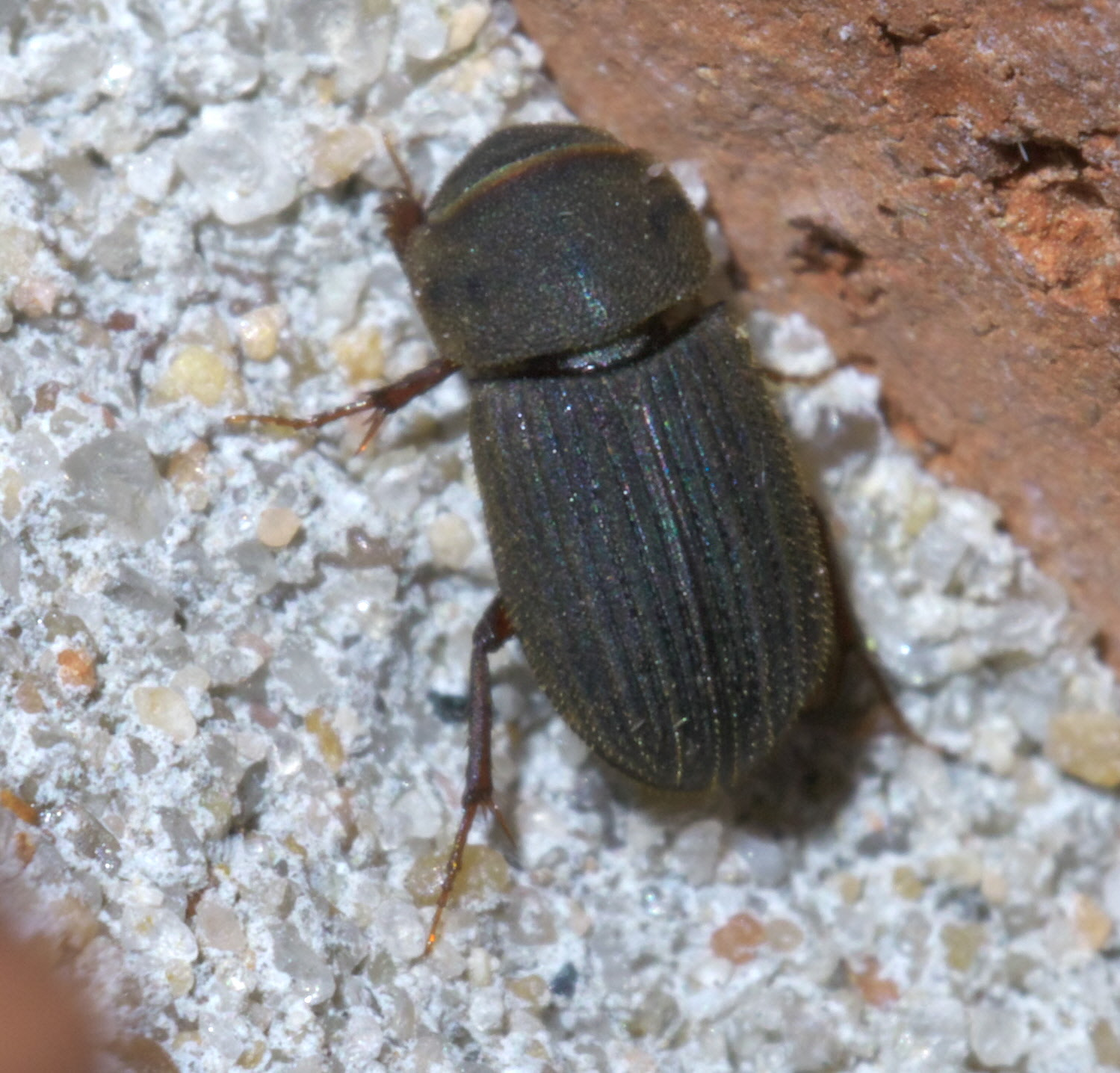
- Ataenius imbricatus

Scientific classification
- Kingdom: Animalia
- Phylum: Arthropoda
- Clade: Pancrustacea
- Class: Insecta
- Order: Coleoptera
- Suborder: Polyphaga
- Infraorder: Scarabaeiformia
- Family: Scarabaeidae
- Subfamily: Aphodiinae
- Tribe: Eupariini; Schmidt, 1910

Synonyms
- Lomanoxiini Stebnicka, 1999

= Eupariini =

Tribe of beetles

Eupariini is a tribe of aphodiine dung beetles in the family Scarabaeidae. There are more than 40 genera and 640 described species in Eupariini.

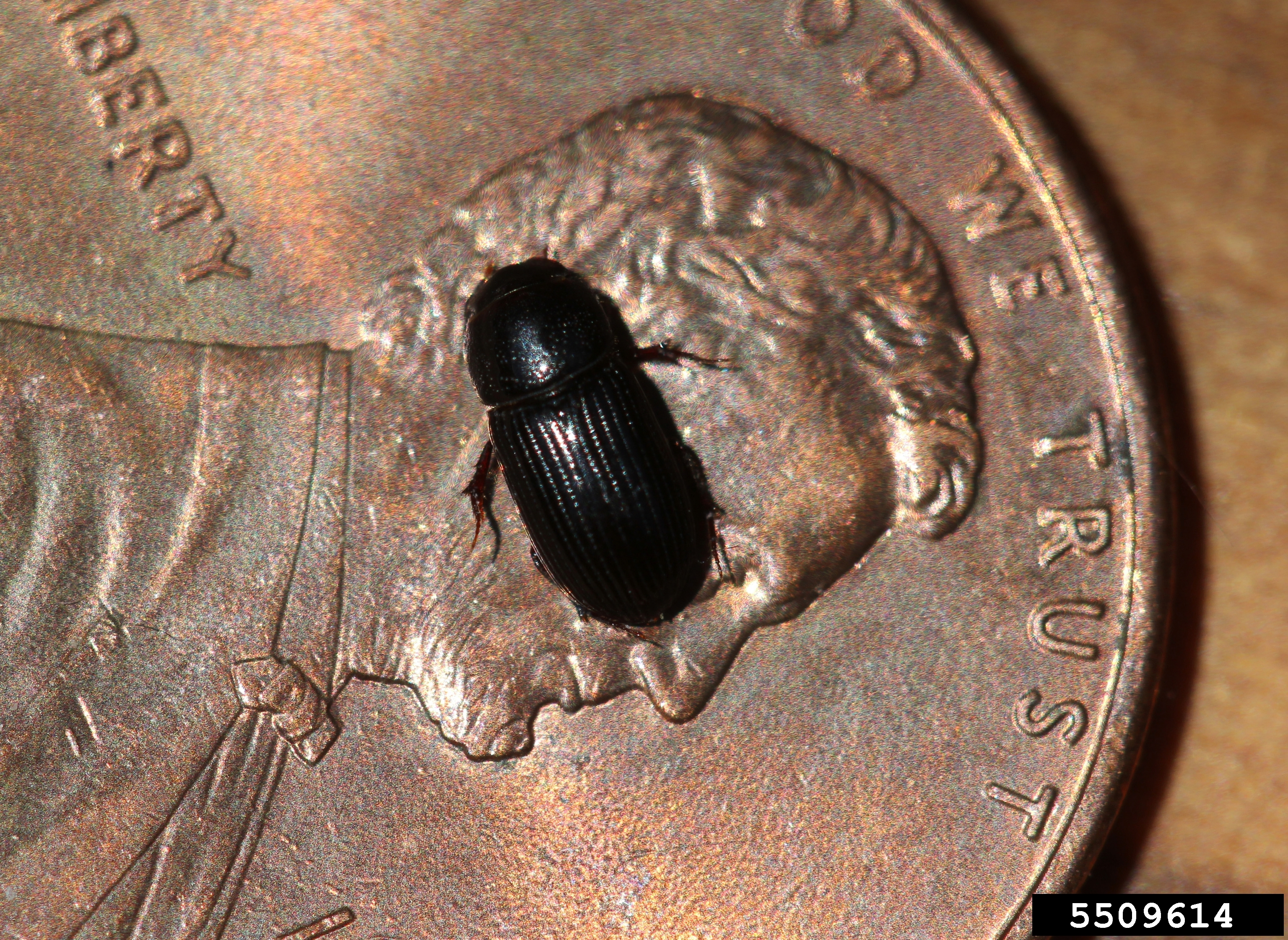
Ataenius spretulus (The coin is 19 mm in diameter.)

== Genera ==
These 42 genera belong to the tribe Eupariini:

- Afroataenius Petrovitz, 1969
- Airapus Stebnicka & Howden, 1996
- Anaetius Petrovitz, 1969
- Annegialia Howden, 1971
- Aphotaenius Cartwright, 1952
- Arupaia Stebnicka, 1999
- Ataeniopsis Petrovitz, 1973
- Ataenius Harold, 1867
- Australammoecius Petrovitz, 1958
- Batesiana Chalumeau, 1983
- Bobiricola Endrödi, 1973
- Bruchaphodius Martinez, 1952
- Cartwrightia Islas, 1958
- Cnematoplatys Schmidt, 1914
- Euparia Le Peletier & Serville, 1828
- Euparixia Brown, 1927
- Euparixoides Hinton, 1936
- Euparotrix Stebnicka & Howden, 1996
- Flechtmanniella Stebnicka, 1999
- Haroldiataenius Chalumeau, 1981
- Iarupea Martinez, 1953
- Iguazua Stebnicka, 1997
- Lomanoxia Martinez, 1951
- Lomanoxoides Stebnicka, 1999
- Martineziana Chalumeau & Özdikmen, 2006
- Myrmecaphodius Martinez, 1952
- Napoa Stebnicka, 1999
- Nettelislasia Martinez, 1952
- Notocaulus Quedenfeldt, 1884
- Odontolytes Koshantschikov, 1916
- Oxyataenius Dellacasa & Stebnicka, 2001
- Paraplesiataenius Chalumeau, 1992
- Parataenius Balthasar, 1961
- Passaliolla Balthasar, 1945
- Pseudataenius Brown, 1927
- Pterobius Murayama, 2010
- Saprosites Redtenbacher, 1857
- Saprovisca Stebnicka, 1993
- Selviria Stebnicka, 1999
- Setylaides Stebnicka, 1994
- Tanyana Stebnicka, 2006
- † Mesydra Ponomarenko, 1977
