= Setylaides monstrosus =

Scientific classification
- Kingdom: Animalia
- Phylum: Arthropoda
- Clade: Pancrustacea
- Class: Insecta
- Order: Coleoptera
- Suborder: Polyphaga
- Infraorder: Scarabaeiformia
- Family: Scarabaeidae
- Genus: Setylaides
- Species: S. monstrosus

Binomial name
- Setylaides monstrosus (Harold, 1877)

Synonyms
- Aulonocnemis monstrosa Harold, 1877; Dialytes paramonstrosus Petrovitz, 1973; Dialytes javanus Schmidt, 1907

Species of beetle

Setylaides monstrosus is a species of beetle of the family Scarabaeidae. It is found in Indonesia (Sumatra, Java) and Malaysia (Sarawak).

== Description ==
Adults reach a length of about 4 mm (0.16 in). They are similar to Setylaides foveatus in shape and coloration, but more robustly built.
