= Aphotaenius plaumanni =

Scientific classification
- Kingdom: Animalia
- Phylum: Arthropoda
- Clade: Pancrustacea
- Class: Insecta
- Order: Coleoptera
- Suborder: Polyphaga
- Infraorder: Scarabaeiformia
- Family: Scarabaeidae
- Genus: Aphotaenius
- Species: A. plaumanni

Binomial name
- Aphotaenius plaumanni Cartwright, 1963

Species of beetle

Aphotaenius plaumanni is a species of beetle of the family Scarabaeidae. It is found in Brazil (Rio Grande do Sul).

== Description ==
Adults reach a length of about 2.6–2.7 mm (0.10–0.11 in). The head has large punctures and the clypeus is emarginate, with the margin obtusely angled on each side of the emargination. The pronotum has punctures of two sizes. The coarse punctures are restricted to the posterior and lateral margins and the smaller punctures are distributed across the pronotal surface. The elytral interstriae have discrete punctures.

== Life history ==
They are attracted to bovine feces and have also been collected in pig dung.
