= Ataeniopsis vinacoensis =

Scientific classification
- Kingdom: Animalia
- Phylum: Arthropoda
- Clade: Pancrustacea
- Class: Insecta
- Order: Coleoptera
- Suborder: Polyphaga
- Infraorder: Scarabaeiformia
- Family: Scarabaeidae
- Genus: Ataeniopsis
- Species: A. vinacoensis

Binomial name
- Ataeniopsis vinacoensis Stebnicka, 2003

Species of beetle

Ataeniopsis vinacoensis is a species of beetle of the family Scarabaeidae. It is found in Argentina.

== Description ==
Adults reach a length of about 4.2–4.5 mm (0.17–0.18 in). They have a dark red to black body, with the legs reddish brown.

== Etymology ==
The species name is derived from the type locality, Vinaco.
