= Lomanoxia melloi =

Scientific classification
- Kingdom: Animalia
- Phylum: Arthropoda
- Clade: Pancrustacea
- Class: Insecta
- Order: Coleoptera
- Suborder: Polyphaga
- Infraorder: Scarabaeiformia
- Family: Scarabaeidae
- Genus: Lomanoxia
- Species: L. melloi

Binomial name
- Lomanoxia melloi Stebnicka, 1999

Species of beetle

Lomanoxia melloi is a species of beetle of the family Scarabaeidae. It is found in Brazil (Bahia, Distrito Federal, Espírito Santo, Goiás, Maranhão, Mato Grosso, Mato Grosso do Sul, Minas Gerais, Rio de Janeiro, Rio Grande do Sul, Rondônia, São Paulo).

== Description ==
Adults reach a length of about 4.8–5 mm (0.19–0.20 in). The head has minute granules and the clypeus is sinuate. The pronotum is setaceous, with the anterior angles expanded forward and the lateral margin fringed with setae. The elytra have weakly convex interstriae and a row of setaceous granules. On the abdomen, ventrites four and five are strigate.
