= Pseudataenius =

Scientific classification
- Kingdom: Animalia
- Phylum: Arthropoda
- Clade: Pancrustacea
- Class: Insecta
- Order: Coleoptera
- Suborder: Polyphaga
- Infraorder: Scarabaeiformia
- Family: Scarabaeidae
- Tribe: Eupariini
- Genus: Pseudataenius; Brown, 1927

Synonyms
- Ataenioides Petrovitz, 1973

Genus of beetles

Pseudataenius is a genus of aphodiine dung beetles in the family Scarabaeidae. There are at least three described species in Pseudataenius.

== Species ==
These three species belong to the genus Pseudataenius:

- Pseudataenius contortus Cartwright, 1974
- Pseudataenius gracilitarsis (Petrovitz, 1973)
- Pseudataenius socialis (Horn, 1871)
