= Australammoecius goyderensis =

Scientific classification
- Kingdom: Animalia
- Phylum: Arthropoda
- Clade: Pancrustacea
- Class: Insecta
- Order: Coleoptera
- Suborder: Polyphaga
- Infraorder: Scarabaeiformia
- Family: Scarabaeidae
- Genus: Australammoecius
- Species: A. goyderensis

Binomial name
- Australammoecius goyderensis (Blackburn, 1896)

Synonyms
- Ataenius goyderensis Blackburn, 1896; Ataenius consors Blackburn, 1904

Species of beetle

Australammoecius goyderensis is a species of beetle of the family Scarabaeidae. It is found in Australia (Western Australia, Northern Territory, Queensland, South Australia).

== Description ==
Adults reach a length of about 3.4–4.8 mm (0.13–0.19 in). They have an elongate-oval, shining, rusty brown to black body.
