= Euparia castanea =

Scientific classification
- Kingdom: Animalia
- Phylum: Arthropoda
- Clade: Pancrustacea
- Class: Insecta
- Order: Coleoptera
- Suborder: Polyphaga
- Infraorder: Scarabaeiformia
- Family: Scarabaeidae
- Genus: Euparia
- Species: E. castanea

Binomial name
- Euparia castanea LePeletier & Serville, 1828

Species of beetle

Euparia castanea is a species of aphodiine dung beetle in the family Scarabaeidae. It is found in Costa Rica, Ecuador, El Salvador, Guatemala, Honduras, Mexico (Campeche, Chiapas, Hidalgo, Oaxaca, Tabasco, Veracruz, Yucatán), Panama and the United States (Florida, Texas).
