= Parataenius derbesis =

Scientific classification
- Kingdom: Animalia
- Phylum: Arthropoda
- Clade: Pancrustacea
- Class: Insecta
- Order: Coleoptera
- Suborder: Polyphaga
- Infraorder: Scarabaeiformia
- Family: Scarabaeidae
- Genus: Parataenius
- Species: P. derbesis

Binomial name
- Parataenius derbesis (Solier, 1851)

Synonyms
- Aphodius derbesis Solier, 1851; Parataenius mirabilis Balthasar, 1961; Ataenius crenulatus Fairmaire, 1883; Euparia cribricollis Burmeister, 1877; Ataenius laborator Harold, 1869; Euparia rubripes Boheman, 1858

Species of beetle

Parataenius derbesis is a species of beetle of the family Scarabaeidae. It is found in Argentina, Brazil (Mato Grosso do Sul), Paraguay and Uruguay.

== Description ==
Adults reach a length of about 4.5–5 mm (0.18–0.20 in). The body is suboval and dorsally glabrous. The head has transverse wrinkles and the clypeus is impunctate and emarginate. The pronotum is convex, with moderate punctures distributed across its surface. The lateral margin is crenulate and fringed with setae. The abdominal ventrites are weakly strigate, except the sixth one. The ventrites have punctures of two sizes, with the larger punctures setiferous.

== Life history ==
They are attracted to cow and Lama guanicoe feces.
