= Ataeniopsis parkeri =

Scientific classification
- Kingdom: Animalia
- Phylum: Arthropoda
- Clade: Pancrustacea
- Class: Insecta
- Order: Coleoptera
- Suborder: Polyphaga
- Infraorder: Scarabaeiformia
- Family: Scarabaeidae
- Genus: Ataeniopsis
- Species: A. parkeri

Binomial name
- Ataeniopsis parkeri (Cartwright, 1974)

Synonyms
- Ataenius parkeri Cartwright, 1974

Species of beetle

Ataeniopsis parkeri is a species of beetle of the family Scarabaeidae. It is found in the United States (Arizona, Texas) and Mexico (Jalisco, Sinaloa, Sonora).

== Description ==
Adults reach a length of about 4–4.3 mm (0.16–0.17 in). They have a castaneous to reddish-black body, with the legs usually lighter.

== Life history ==
They have been collected in oak grasslands.
