= Australammoecius occidentalis =

Scientific classification
- Kingdom: Animalia
- Phylum: Arthropoda
- Clade: Pancrustacea
- Class: Insecta
- Order: Coleoptera
- Suborder: Polyphaga
- Infraorder: Scarabaeiformia
- Family: Scarabaeidae
- Genus: Australammoecius
- Species: A. occidentalis

Binomial name
- Australammoecius occidentalis (MacLeay, 1888)

Synonyms
- Ammoecius occidentalis MacLeay, 1888; Ataenius consobrinus Petrovitz, 1961; Ataenius latericollis Lea, 1926; Ataenius spissus Blackburn, 1904

Species of beetle

Australammoecius occidentalis is a species of beetle of the family Scarabaeidae. It is found in Australia (Western Australia, Northern Territory, Queensland).

== Description ==
Adults reach a length of about 2.5–3.5 mm (0.098–0.138 in). They have a suboval, shining, rusty brown to dark castaneous body, sometimes with the elytra lighter than the head and pronotum.

== Life history ==
Specimens have been collected in moist forests.
