= Haroldiataenius hintoni =

Scientific classification
- Kingdom: Animalia
- Phylum: Arthropoda
- Clade: Pancrustacea
- Class: Insecta
- Order: Coleoptera
- Suborder: Polyphaga
- Infraorder: Scarabaeiformia
- Family: Scarabaeidae
- Genus: Haroldiataenius
- Species: H. hintoni

Binomial name
- Haroldiataenius hintoni (Saylor, 1933)

Synonyms
- Ataenius hintoni Saylor, 1933

Species of beetle

Haroldiataenius hintoni is a species of beetle of the family Scarabaeidae. It is found in Guatemala, Honduras and Mexico (Chiapas, Distrito Federal, Jalisco, Sonora, Tamaulipas).

== Description ==
Adults reach a length of about 3–3.3 mm (0.12–0.13 in). They have a dark reddish brown, shining body.

== Life history ==
Specimens have been collected in detritus remnants in nest of Atta sexdens.
