= Airapus aegialiformis =

Scientific classification
- Kingdom: Animalia
- Phylum: Arthropoda
- Clade: Pancrustacea
- Class: Insecta
- Order: Coleoptera
- Suborder: Polyphaga
- Infraorder: Scarabaeiformia
- Family: Scarabaeidae
- Genus: Airapus
- Species: A. aegialiformis

Binomial name
- Airapus aegialiformis Minkina, 2020

Species of beetle

Airapus aegialiformis is a species of beetle of the family Scarabaeidae. It is found in Indonesia (Sumatra).

== Description ==
Adults reach a length of about 4.3 mm (0.17 in). They have an elongate, shiny, brownish, glabrous body.

== Etymology ==
The species name is derived from the combination of aegiali (from Aegialiinae, because the species has the general body shape of members of that subfamily) and formis (meaning shape).
