= Aphotaenius convexus =

Scientific classification
- Kingdom: Animalia
- Phylum: Arthropoda
- Clade: Pancrustacea
- Class: Insecta
- Order: Coleoptera
- Suborder: Polyphaga
- Infraorder: Scarabaeiformia
- Family: Scarabaeidae
- Genus: Aphotaenius
- Species: A. convexus

Binomial name
- Aphotaenius convexus (Harold, 1880)

Synonyms
- Saprosites convexus Harold, 1880; Aphotaenius colombiensis Cartwright, 1952

Species of beetle

Aphotaenius convexus is a species of beetle of the family Scarabaeidae. It is found in Colombia and Venezuela.

== Description ==
Adults reach a length of about 3.3–3.9 mm (0.13–0.15 in).
