= Lomanoxoides selviriaensis =

Scientific classification
- Kingdom: Animalia
- Phylum: Arthropoda
- Clade: Pancrustacea
- Class: Insecta
- Order: Coleoptera
- Suborder: Polyphaga
- Infraorder: Scarabaeiformia
- Family: Scarabaeidae
- Genus: Lomanoxoides
- Species: L. selviriaensis

Binomial name
- Lomanoxoides selviriaensis Stebnicka, 1999

Species of beetle

Lomanoxoides selviriaensis is a species of beetle of the family Scarabaeidae. It is found in Brazil (Mato Grosso, Mato Grosso do Sul).

== Description ==
Adults reach a length of about 5–5.5 mm (0.20–0.22 in). The body is piceous and the head is punctate, with the punctures larger and closer on the frons. The pronotum has punctures of two sizes, the larger punctures are scattered across the surface, and are mixed with moderate punctures. The surface is uneven with two lateral tubercles and large deep posteromedial fossa. The elytra are setaceous with convex, tectiform interstriae.

== Life history ==
Specimens have been collected in Urochloa decumbens with UV light traps and were also extracted from Guzera bovine fecal masses.
