= Selviria anneae =

Scientific classification
- Kingdom: Animalia
- Phylum: Arthropoda
- Clade: Pancrustacea
- Class: Insecta
- Order: Coleoptera
- Suborder: Polyphaga
- Infraorder: Scarabaeiformia
- Family: Scarabaeidae
- Genus: Selviria
- Species: S. anneae

Binomial name
- Selviria anneae Stebnicka, 2005

Species of beetle

Selviria anneae is a species of dung beetles in the subfamily Aphodiinae. It is found in Brazil (Minas Gerais).

== Description ==
Adults reach a length of about 4.8–5 mm (0.19–0.20 in). The lateral margins of the pronotum and margins of the elytra are greatly explanate. The head is wide and the clypeus is emarginate. The pronotum has punctures of two sizes: fine and moderate. The elytra have convex interstriae, lacking humeral teeth.
