= Aphotaenius carolinus =

Scientific classification
- Kingdom: Animalia
- Phylum: Arthropoda
- Clade: Pancrustacea
- Class: Insecta
- Order: Coleoptera
- Suborder: Polyphaga
- Infraorder: Scarabaeiformia
- Family: Scarabaeidae
- Genus: Aphotaenius
- Species: A. carolinus

Binomial name
- Aphotaenius carolinus (Van Dyke, 1928)

Synonyms
- Ataenius carolinus Van Dyke, 1928

Species of beetle

Aphotaenius carolinus is a species of aphodiine dung beetle in the family Scarabaeidae. It is found in North America, where it has been recorded from the United States (Alabama, Arkansas, Florida, Georgia, Indiana, Iowa, Kansas, Kentucky, Louisiana, Maryland, Mississippi, Nebraska, North Carolina, Ohio, South Carolina, Virginia, Tennessee).

== Description ==
Adults reach a length of about 2.4–3.1 mm (0.094–0.122 in).

== Life history ==
They have been collected from deer, sheep, dog, pack rat and cow dung, and is sometimes also found in leaf litter.
