= Batesiana tuberculata =

Scientific classification
- Kingdom: Animalia
- Phylum: Arthropoda
- Clade: Pancrustacea
- Class: Insecta
- Order: Coleoptera
- Suborder: Polyphaga
- Infraorder: Scarabaeiformia
- Family: Scarabaeidae
- Genus: Batesiana
- Species: B. tuberculata

Binomial name
- Batesiana tuberculata (Bates, 1887)

Synonyms
- Euparia tuberculata Bates, 1887

Species of beetle

Batesiana tuberculata is a species of beetle of the family Scarabaeidae. It is found in Bolivia, Brazil (Acre, Amazonas, Mato Grosso, Pará, Rondônia), Colombia, Costa Rica, French Guiana, Panama, Suriname and Trinidad.

== Description ==
Adults reach a length of about 5.3–6.6 mm (0.21–0.26 in). The head is strongly punctate and gibbous medially. The clypeus is not sinuate, with a glabrous band near the anterior margin. The pronotum has the lateral margins explanate, and the posterior angles right-angled. The pronotum is punctate with coarse punctures, larger and closer near the lateral margins. The elytra have tuberculate interstriae. The meso- and metatibiae, as well the tarsi, are densely setaceous ventrally, with the apical spurs sometimes hidden by the setae.

== Life history ==
Some specimens were found associated with Attalea speciosa.
