= Lomanoxia costulata =

Scientific classification
- Kingdom: Animalia
- Phylum: Arthropoda
- Clade: Pancrustacea
- Class: Insecta
- Order: Coleoptera
- Suborder: Polyphaga
- Infraorder: Scarabaeiformia
- Family: Scarabaeidae
- Genus: Lomanoxia
- Species: L. costulata

Binomial name
- Lomanoxia costulata (Harold, 1867)

Synonyms
- Euparia costulata Harold, 1867

Species of beetle

Lomanoxia costulata is a species of beetle of the family Scarabaeidae. It is found in Argentina, Brazil (Bahia, Goiás, Mato Grosso, Mato Grosso do Sul, Minas Gerais, Rio de Janeiro, Santa Catarina), Colombia, Paraguay and Suriname.

== Description ==
Adults reach a length of about 4.5–5 mm (0.18–0.20 in). The head has minute granules and the clypeus is sinuate. The pronotum] is setaceous, with the anterior angles expanded forward and the lateral margins contiguous to the posterior margin, fringed by setae of similar size of those of the posterior angles. The posterior margin has a medial lobe. The elytra are broad, but not broader than the pronotum. The interstriae are tectiform, with minute setaceous elevations. On the abdomen, ventrites four and five are strigate anteriorly.

== Life history ==
Specimens have been found in Eucalyptus grandis forests and Urochloa decumbens pastures. Some specimens were extracted from nests of Atta sexdens.
