= Ataeniopsis parallelus =

Scientific classification
- Kingdom: Animalia
- Phylum: Arthropoda
- Clade: Pancrustacea
- Class: Insecta
- Order: Coleoptera
- Suborder: Polyphaga
- Infraorder: Scarabaeiformia
- Family: Scarabaeidae
- Genus: Ataeniopsis
- Species: A. parallelus

Binomial name
- Ataeniopsis parallelus (Petrovitz, 1961)

Synonyms
- Ataenius parallelus Petrovitz, 1961

Species of beetle

Ataeniopsis parallelus is a species of beetle of the family Scarabaeidae. It is found in Brazil (Amazonas).

== Description ==
Adults reach a length of about 2.8–3 mm (0.11–0.12 in). The body is dark red and the head is alutaceous, with the clypeus slightly sinuate and with somewhat large denticles. The pronotum is densely punctate with both large and moderate punctures. The elytra are approximately twice as long as the pronotum and the interstriae are punctured by fine and inconspicuous punctures. The pygidium has three to four fine punctures along the median carina and the anterior margin is glossy and convex.
