= Pseudataenius socialis =

Scientific classification
- Kingdom: Animalia
- Phylum: Arthropoda
- Clade: Pancrustacea
- Class: Insecta
- Order: Coleoptera
- Suborder: Polyphaga
- Infraorder: Scarabaeiformia
- Family: Scarabaeidae
- Genus: Pseudataenius
- Species: P. socialis

Binomial name
- Pseudataenius socialis (Horn, 1871)

Synonyms
- Ataenius socialis Horn, 1871; Ataenius socialis Harold, 1874

Species of beetle

Pseudataenius socialis is a species of aphodiine dung beetle in the family Scarabaeidae. It is found in North America, where it has been recorded from Kansas, Louisiana, Nebraska, Oklahoma, South Carolina and Texas.

== Description ==
Adults reach a length of about 4.2–5 mm (0.17–0.20 in). They have an elongate-oblong, castaneous, shining body.

== Life history ==
Specimens have been collected in cow dung and in Cynomys burrows.
