= Parataenius simulator =

Scientific classification
- Kingdom: Animalia
- Phylum: Arthropoda
- Clade: Pancrustacea
- Class: Insecta
- Order: Coleoptera
- Suborder: Polyphaga
- Infraorder: Scarabaeiformia
- Family: Scarabaeidae
- Genus: Parataenius
- Species: P. simulator

Binomial name
- Parataenius simulator (Harold, 1868)

Synonyms
- Ataenius lusitanicus Paulian, 1979; Parataenius granuliceps Petrovitz, 1971; Psammodius schwarzi Linell, 1896

Species of beetle

Parataenius simulator is a species of aphodiine dung beetle in the family Scarabaeidae. It is found in Africa, Australia, the Caribbean, Europe, Northern Asia (excluding China), Central America, North America, and South America.

== Description ==
Adults reach a length of about 3.8–5.9 mm (0.15–0.23 in). The body is robust, elongate and glabrous dorsally. The head has strong transverse wrinkles and there are punctures on the frons. The clypeus is emarginate and impunctate. The pronotum has punctures of two sizes. The larger punctures are scarce and restricted to the posterior and lateral margins. The lateral margins are fringed with setae. The elytra have punctate interstriae, with the punctures fine and widely spaced. The abdominal ventrites have large punctures to the sides.

== Life history ==
The larvae have been collected in bovine faecal masses, while adult specimens have also been collected in logs and leaf litter.
