= Haroldiataenius limbatus =

Scientific classification
- Kingdom: Animalia
- Phylum: Arthropoda
- Clade: Pancrustacea
- Class: Insecta
- Order: Coleoptera
- Suborder: Polyphaga
- Infraorder: Scarabaeiformia
- Family: Scarabaeidae
- Genus: Haroldiataenius
- Species: H. limbatus

Binomial name
- Haroldiataenius limbatus (Bates, 1887)

Synonyms
- Ataenius limbatus Bates, 1887

Species of beetle

Haroldiataenius limbatus is a species of aphodiine dung beetle in the family Scarabaeidae. It is found in El Salvador, Guatemala, Honduras, Mexico (Campeche, Chiapas, Hidalgo, Jalisco, Morelos, Nuevo León, Oaxaca, Puebla, Sinaloa, Sonora) and in the United States (Arizona).

== Description ==
Adults reach a length of about 4.5–5 mm (0.18–0.20 in). They have a dark castaneous to piceous body.

== Life history ==
Specimens have been collected in leaf litter in oak-pine forests, as well as in cattle dung, and in refuse piles created by Atta species.
