= Ataeniopsis regulus =

Scientific classification
- Kingdom: Animalia
- Phylum: Arthropoda
- Clade: Pancrustacea
- Class: Insecta
- Order: Coleoptera
- Suborder: Polyphaga
- Infraorder: Scarabaeiformia
- Family: Scarabaeidae
- Genus: Ataeniopsis
- Species: A. regulus

Binomial name
- Ataeniopsis regulus (Balthasar, 1947)

Synonyms
- Ataenius regulus Balthasar, 1947; Ataenius abdominalis Petrovitz, 1973; Ataenius bordoni Petrovitz, 1972

Species of beetle

Ataeniopsis regulus is a species of beetle of the family Scarabaeidae. It is found in Brazil (Mato Grosso, Piauí, Roraima), Colombia, Ecuador, Guyana, Peru, Suriname and Venezuela.

== Description ==
Adults reach a length of about 3.2–4 mm (0.13–0.16 in). The body is piceous and the head is alutaceous, the clypeus with two minute denticles and weakly emarginate medially. The pronotum has punctures of two sizes (large and minute). The large punctures are distributed everywhere, and intermixed with inconspicuously minute ones. The pronotum also has a posterior marginal line. The elytra are approximately twice the length of the pronotum. The interstriae have small, irregularly spaced punctures. The disc of the pygidium is eroded by group of large coalescent punctures.

== Life history ==
Specimens have been collected in open areas, near ponds and coconut groves at altitudes of up to 81 metres.
