= Australammoecius =

Scientific classification
- Kingdom: Animalia
- Phylum: Arthropoda
- Clade: Pancrustacea
- Class: Insecta
- Order: Coleoptera
- Suborder: Polyphaga
- Infraorder: Scarabaeiformia
- Family: Scarabaeidae
- Subfamily: Aphodiinae
- Tribe: Eupariini
- Genus: Australammoecius; Petrovitz, 1958

Genus of beetles

Australammoecius is a genus of beetles of the family Scarabaeidae.

== Species ==
- Australammoecius aphodioides (Lea, 1923)
- Australammoecius coloratus (Blackburn, 1904)
- Australammoecius goyderensis (Blackburn, 1896)
- Australammoecius occidentalis (MacLeay, 1888)
- Australammoecius peckorum Stebnicka & Howden, 1996
- Australammoecius persimilis (Lea, 1923)
