= Selviria matogrossoensis =

Scientific classification
- Kingdom: Animalia
- Phylum: Arthropoda
- Clade: Pancrustacea
- Class: Insecta
- Order: Coleoptera
- Suborder: Polyphaga
- Infraorder: Scarabaeiformia
- Family: Scarabaeidae
- Genus: Selviria
- Species: S. matogrossoensis

Binomial name
- Selviria matogrossoensis Stebnicka, 1999

Species of beetle

Selviria matogrossoensis is a species of beetle of the family Scarabaeidae. It is found in Bolivia and Brazil (Mato Grosso do Sul, Minas Gerais).

== Description ==
Adults reach a length of about 4.8–5 mm (0.19–0.20 in). The head is finely punctate and the clypeus is emarginate. The pronotum is laterally explanate and fringed by spatulate setae. The elytra have humeral teeth and flat interstriae. The lateral and posterior margins are explanate.

== Life history ==
Specimens were collected in pasture regions and in nests of Solenopsis invicta.
