= Airapus obscurus =

Scientific classification
- Kingdom: Animalia
- Phylum: Arthropoda
- Clade: Pancrustacea
- Class: Insecta
- Order: Coleoptera
- Suborder: Polyphaga
- Infraorder: Scarabaeiformia
- Family: Scarabaeidae
- Genus: Airapus
- Species: A. obscurus

Binomial name
- Airapus obscurus (MacLeay, 1871)

Synonyms
- Ammoecius obscurus MacLeay, 1871; Euparia olliffi Blackburn, 1904

Species of beetle

Airapus obscurus is a species of beetle of the family Scarabaeidae. It is found in Australia (New South Wales, Queensland).

== Description ==
Adults reach a length of about 4.8–6 mm (0.19–0.24 in). They have an elongate, moderately shining, castaneous to black body, with the club of the antennae brown.
