= Euparotrix =

Scientific classification
- Kingdom: Animalia
- Phylum: Arthropoda
- Clade: Pancrustacea
- Class: Insecta
- Order: Coleoptera
- Suborder: Polyphaga
- Infraorder: Scarabaeiformia
- Family: Scarabaeidae
- Subfamily: Aphodiinae
- Tribe: Eupariini
- Genus: Euparotrix; Stebnicka & Howden, 1996
- Species: E. squamosa

Binomial name
- Euparotrix squamosa (Lea, 1923)

Synonyms
- Euparia squamosa Lea, 1923

Genus of beetles

Euparotrix is a genus of beetle of the family Scarabaeidae. It is monotypic, being represented by the single species, Euparotrix squamosa, which is found in Australia (Lord Howe Island).

== Description ==
Adults reach a length of about 4.8–5.8 mm (0.19–0.23 in). They have a plump, brown to black body, covered by golden yellow scales and setae. The elytra usually have an argillaceous coating.

== Life history ==
Specimens have been found in moss, fungi, rotting wood and leaf litter. They are thought to be myrmecophilous.
