= Batesiana =

Scientific classification
- Kingdom: Animalia
- Phylum: Arthropoda
- Clade: Pancrustacea
- Class: Insecta
- Order: Coleoptera
- Suborder: Polyphaga
- Infraorder: Scarabaeiformia
- Family: Scarabaeidae
- Subfamily: Aphodiinae
- Tribe: Eupariini
- Genus: Batesiana; Chalumeau, 1983

Genus of beetles

Batesiana is a genus of beetles of the family Scarabaeidae.

== Species ==
- Batesiana chamorroi Skelley & Vaz-de-Mello, 2022
- Batesiana tuberculata (Bates, 1887)
