= Lomanoxoides =

Scientific classification
- Kingdom: Animalia
- Phylum: Arthropoda
- Clade: Pancrustacea
- Class: Insecta
- Order: Coleoptera
- Suborder: Polyphaga
- Infraorder: Scarabaeiformia
- Family: Scarabaeidae
- Subfamily: Aphodiinae
- Tribe: Eupariini
- Genus: Lomanoxoides; Stebnicka, 1999

Genus of beetles

Lomanoxoides is a genus of beetles of the family Scarabaeidae.

== Species ==
- Lomanoxoides bitubericollis (Schmidt, 1909)
- Lomanoxoides herediae Stebnicka & Skelley, 2005
- Lomanoxoides mapitunari Stebnicka & Skelley, 2005
- Lomanoxoides nigrolineatus (Hinton, 1938)
- Lomanoxoides selviriaensis Stebnicka, 1999
- Lomanoxoides setosus (Balthasar, 1941)
- Lomanoxoides tesari (Balthasar, 1963)
