= Paraplesiataenius tremolerasi =

Scientific classification
- Kingdom: Animalia
- Phylum: Arthropoda
- Clade: Pancrustacea
- Class: Insecta
- Order: Coleoptera
- Suborder: Polyphaga
- Infraorder: Scarabaeiformia
- Family: Scarabaeidae
- Genus: Paraplesiataenius
- Species: P. tremolerasi

Binomial name
- Paraplesiataenius tremolerasi (Schmidt, 1910)

Synonyms
- Ataenius tremolerasi Schmidt, 1910

Species of beetle

Paraplesiataenius tremolerasi is a species of beetle of the family Scarabaeidae. It is found in Argentina and Uruguay.

== Description ==
Adults reach a length of about 4 mm (0.16 in). They have a convex, short, broad, shiny, blackish body, with the margin of the clypeus, pronotum and elytra laterally reddish and the latter also at the apex.
