= Cnematoplatys =

Scientific classification
- Kingdom: Animalia
- Phylum: Arthropoda
- Clade: Pancrustacea
- Class: Insecta
- Order: Coleoptera
- Suborder: Polyphaga
- Infraorder: Scarabaeiformia
- Family: Scarabaeidae
- Subfamily: Aphodiinae
- Tribe: Eupariini
- Genus: Cnematoplatys; Schmidt, 1914

Synonyms
- Neosaprosites Endrödi, 1951

Genus of beetles

Cnematoplatys is a genus of beetles of the family Scarabaeidae.

== Species ==
- Cnematoplatys benardi Schmidt, 1914
- Cnematoplatys cylindrica (Endrödi, 1951)
- Cnematoplatys numensis (Stebnicka, 1986)
- Cnematoplatys sumatrana Balthasar, 1967
- Cnematoplatys torricellensis Stebnicka, 1998
- Cnematoplatys tozerensis Stebnicka & Howden, 1996
- Cnematoplatys yorkensis Stebnicka, 2006
