= Australammoecius peckorum =

Scientific classification
- Kingdom: Animalia
- Phylum: Arthropoda
- Clade: Pancrustacea
- Class: Insecta
- Order: Coleoptera
- Suborder: Polyphaga
- Infraorder: Scarabaeiformia
- Family: Scarabaeidae
- Genus: Australammoecius
- Species: A. peckorum

Binomial name
- Australammoecius peckorum Stebnicka & Howden, 1996

Species of beetle

Australammoecius peckorum is a species of beetle of the family Scarabaeidae. It is found in Australia (Northern Territory).

== Description ==
Adults reach a length of about 2.2–2.5 mm (0.087–0.098 in). They have a suboval, shining or slightly alutaceous, yellowish brown to dark brown body, sometimes with the elytra lighter than the head and pronotum or with the apical half of the elytra lighter.

== Etymology ==
The species is named in honour of Jarmila and Stewart Peck.
