= Iguazua =

Scientific classification
- Kingdom: Animalia
- Phylum: Arthropoda
- Clade: Pancrustacea
- Class: Insecta
- Order: Coleoptera
- Suborder: Polyphaga
- Infraorder: Scarabaeiformia
- Family: Scarabaeidae
- Subfamily: Aphodiinae
- Tribe: Eupariini
- Genus: Iguazua; Stebnicka, 1997

Genus of beetles

Iguazua is a genus of beetles of the family Scarabaeidae.

== Species ==
- Iguazua blackwelderi (Chapin, 1940)
- Iguazua costaricensis Stebnicka & Skelley, 2005
- Iguazua lilloana Stebnicka, 1997
