= Euparixia costaricensis =

Scientific classification
- Kingdom: Animalia
- Phylum: Arthropoda
- Clade: Pancrustacea
- Class: Insecta
- Order: Coleoptera
- Suborder: Polyphaga
- Infraorder: Scarabaeiformia
- Family: Scarabaeidae
- Genus: Euparixia
- Species: E. costaricensis

Binomial name
- Euparixia costaricensis Hinton, 1936

Species of beetle

Euparixia costaricensis is a species of beetle of the family Scarabaeidae. It is found in Costa Rica and Honduras.

== Description ==
Adults reach a length of about 4.5 mm (0.18 in). They have an elongate, convex, moderately shining, very dark brown body, with the margins of the pronotum and the head reddish brown, while the legs and ventral surface are similarly dark brown.
