= Lomanoxoides bitubericollis =

Scientific classification
- Kingdom: Animalia
- Phylum: Arthropoda
- Clade: Pancrustacea
- Class: Insecta
- Order: Coleoptera
- Suborder: Polyphaga
- Infraorder: Scarabaeiformia
- Family: Scarabaeidae
- Genus: Lomanoxoides
- Species: L. bitubericollis

Binomial name
- Lomanoxoides bitubericollis (Schmidt, 1909)

Synonyms
- Euparia bitubericollis Schmidt, 1909

Species of beetle

Lomanoxoides bitubericollis is a species of beetle of the family Scarabaeidae. It is found in Argentina and Brazil (Rio Grande do Sul).

== Description ==
Adults reach a length of about 5–5.5 mm (0.20–0.22 in). The body is piceous and the head is punctate, with larger punctures restricted on the frons. The clypeus is emarginate. The pronotum is punctate, with larger punctures restricted to the posterior third. The pronotal surface is irregular, laterally tuberculate, with shallow posteromedial fossa. The lateral margins are explanate, with evident, but short, spatulate setae. The elytral interstriae are convex and glabrous, with a row of fine punctures medially.
