= Euparixia mexicana =

Scientific classification
- Kingdom: Animalia
- Phylum: Arthropoda
- Clade: Pancrustacea
- Class: Insecta
- Order: Coleoptera
- Suborder: Polyphaga
- Infraorder: Scarabaeiformia
- Family: Scarabaeidae
- Genus: Euparixia
- Species: E. mexicana

Binomial name
- Euparixia mexicana Gordon & Mccleve, 2003

Species of beetle

Euparixia mexicana is a species of beetle of the family Scarabaeidae. It is found in Mexico (Colima, Jalisco, Nayarit, Sinaloa, Sonora).

== Description ==
Adults reach a length of about 4.8–5.7 mm (0.19–0.22 in). They have an elongate, convex, feebly shiny, dark reddish brown body.

== Life history ==
The host of Euparixia mexicana is thought to be Atta mexicana.

== Etymology ==
The species name refers to the country where all type specimens were taken.
