= Airapus tyri =

Scientific classification
- Kingdom: Animalia
- Phylum: Arthropoda
- Clade: Pancrustacea
- Class: Insecta
- Order: Coleoptera
- Suborder: Polyphaga
- Infraorder: Scarabaeiformia
- Family: Scarabaeidae
- Genus: Airapus
- Species: A. tyri

Binomial name
- Airapus tyri Král, Mencl & Rakovič, 2019

Species of beetle

Airapus tyri is a species of beetle of the family Scarabaeidae. It is found in Thailand.

== Description ==
Adults reach a length of about 3.1–3.8 mm (0.12–0.15 in). They have an oblong-oval, subparallel, convex, vaguely shining, mostly black to blackish brown body, with the forebody darker than the elytra.

== Etymology ==
The species is named after Václav Týr, who provided the authors with the type material.
