= Lomanoxoides nigrolineatus =

Scientific classification
- Kingdom: Animalia
- Phylum: Arthropoda
- Clade: Pancrustacea
- Class: Insecta
- Order: Coleoptera
- Suborder: Polyphaga
- Infraorder: Scarabaeiformia
- Family: Scarabaeidae
- Genus: Lomanoxoides
- Species: L. nigrolineatus

Binomial name
- Lomanoxoides nigrolineatus (Hinton, 1938)

Synonyms
- Ataenius nigrolineatus Hinton, 1938

Species of beetle

Lomanoxoides nigrolineatus is a species of beetle of the family Scarabaeidae. It is found in Colombia and Panama.

== Life history ==
Specimens have been collected in detritus piles of leaf-cutter ants of the Atta genus.
