= Cnematoplatys torricellensis =

Scientific classification
- Kingdom: Animalia
- Phylum: Arthropoda
- Clade: Pancrustacea
- Class: Insecta
- Order: Coleoptera
- Suborder: Polyphaga
- Infraorder: Scarabaeiformia
- Family: Scarabaeidae
- Genus: Cnematoplatys
- Species: C. torricellensis

Binomial name
- Cnematoplatys torricellensis Stebnicka, 1998

Species of beetle

Cnematoplatys torricellensis is a species of beetle of the family Scarabaeidae. It is found in Papua New Guinea.

== Description ==
Adults reach a length of about 4 mm (0.16 in). They have an elongate, parallel-sided body. The upper surface is covered with tiny setae.
