= Cnematoplatys numensis =

Scientific classification
- Kingdom: Animalia
- Phylum: Arthropoda
- Clade: Pancrustacea
- Class: Insecta
- Order: Coleoptera
- Suborder: Polyphaga
- Infraorder: Scarabaeiformia
- Family: Scarabaeidae
- Genus: Cnematoplatys
- Species: C. numensis

Binomial name
- Cnematoplatys numensis (Stebnicka, 1986)

Synonyms
- Aphodius numensis Stebnicka, 1986

Species of beetle

Cnematoplatys numensis is a species of beetle of the family Scarabaeidae. It is found in Nepal and Thailand.

== Description ==
Adults reach a length of about 4.2–4.5 mm (0.17–0.18 in). They have an elongate, parallel-sided, moderately shining, dark castenous body.
