= Passaliolla =

- Passaliolla corticalis

Scientific classification
- Kingdom: Animalia
- Phylum: Arthropoda
- Clade: Pancrustacea
- Class: Insecta
- Order: Coleoptera
- Suborder: Polyphaga
- Infraorder: Scarabaeiformia
- Family: Scarabaeidae
- Subfamily: Aphodiinae
- Tribe: Eupariini
- Genus: Passaliolla; Balthasar, 1945

Genus of beetles

Passaliolla is a genus of beetles of the family Scarabaeidae.

== Species ==
- Passaliolla aspericeps (Harold, 1876)
- Passaliolla cancellata (Bates, 1887)
- Passaliolla corticalis (Bates, 1887)
- Passaliolla cossonoides (Bates, 1887)
- Passaliolla eugastrica (Harold, 1869)
