= Airapus henriettae =

Scientific classification
- Kingdom: Animalia
- Phylum: Arthropoda
- Clade: Pancrustacea
- Class: Insecta
- Order: Coleoptera
- Suborder: Polyphaga
- Infraorder: Scarabaeiformia
- Family: Scarabaeidae
- Genus: Airapus
- Species: A. henriettae

Binomial name
- Airapus henriettae Stebnicka & Howden, 1996

Species of beetle

Airapus henriettae is a species of beetle of the family Scarabaeidae. It is found in Australia (Queensland).

== Description ==
Adults reach a length of about 4–4.5 mm (0.16–0.18 in). They have an alutaceous, moderately shining to mat, brownish-black to black body.
