= Euparixoides cribratus =

Scientific classification
- Kingdom: Animalia
- Phylum: Arthropoda
- Clade: Pancrustacea
- Class: Insecta
- Order: Coleoptera
- Suborder: Polyphaga
- Infraorder: Scarabaeiformia
- Family: Scarabaeidae
- Genus: Euparixoides
- Species: E. cribratus

Binomial name
- Euparixoides cribratus Hinton, 1936

Species of beetle

Euparixoides cribratus is a species of beetle of the family Scarabaeidae. It is found in Costa Rica, Honduras, Nicaragua and Panama.
