= Aphotaenius howdeni =

Scientific classification
- Kingdom: Animalia
- Phylum: Arthropoda
- Clade: Pancrustacea
- Class: Insecta
- Order: Coleoptera
- Suborder: Polyphaga
- Infraorder: Scarabaeiformia
- Family: Scarabaeidae
- Genus: Aphotaenius
- Species: A. howdeni

Binomial name
- Aphotaenius howdeni Cartwright, 1963

Species of beetle

Aphotaenius howdeni is a species of beetle of the family Scarabaeidae. It is found in Mexico (Chiapas, Hidalgo, Nuevo León).

== Description ==
Adults reach a length of about 2.9–3.3 mm (0.11–0.13 in).

== Life history ==
They have been collected in deciduous forests, where it has been recorded feeding on dung.
