= Tanyana aniae =

Scientific classification
- Kingdom: Animalia
- Phylum: Arthropoda
- Clade: Pancrustacea
- Class: Insecta
- Order: Coleoptera
- Suborder: Polyphaga
- Infraorder: Scarabaeiformia
- Family: Scarabaeidae
- Genus: Tanyana
- Species: T. aniae

Binomial name
- Tanyana aniae Minkina, 2022

Species of beetle

Tanyana aniae is a species of beetle of the family Scarabaeidae. It is found in French Guiana, Peru and possibly Brazil.

== Description ==
Adults reach a length of about 2.5–2.9 mm (0.098–0.114 in). The head has scarce, scattered, coarse punctures and the clypeus is weakly sinuate. The pronotum has fine and coarse punctures, the latter scattered and closer near the lateral margins. The elytral striae are coarsely punctate.
