= Ataeniopsis haroldi =

Scientific classification
- Kingdom: Animalia
- Phylum: Arthropoda
- Clade: Pancrustacea
- Class: Insecta
- Order: Coleoptera
- Suborder: Polyphaga
- Infraorder: Scarabaeiformia
- Family: Scarabaeidae
- Genus: Ataeniopsis
- Species: A. haroldi

Binomial name
- Ataeniopsis haroldi (Steinheil, 1872)

Synonyms
- Ataenius haroldi Steinheil, 1872

Species of beetle

Ataeniopsis haroldi is a species of beetle of the family Scarabaeidae. It is found in Argentina, Bolivia, Brazil (Mato Grosso, Mato Grosso do Sul, Piauí), Paraguay and Uruguay.

== Description ==
Adults reach a length of about 4.2–4.8 mm (0.17–0.19 in). The body is piceous and the clypeus is denticulate and weakly emarginate medially. The pronotum has the posterior marginal line preset and punctures of two sizes (fine and large). The fine punctures are inconspicuous among the large ones. The large punctures are closer near the lateral margins. The elytra are glabrous and glossy and more than three times longer than the pronotum. The pygidium is convex, and glossy with fine punctures.

== Life history ==
Specimens are attracted to light and can be found in flooded plains and seasonal subtropical forests.
