= Aphotaenius cambeforti =

Scientific classification
- Kingdom: Animalia
- Phylum: Arthropoda
- Clade: Pancrustacea
- Class: Insecta
- Order: Coleoptera
- Suborder: Polyphaga
- Infraorder: Scarabaeiformia
- Family: Scarabaeidae
- Genus: Aphotaenius
- Species: A. cambeforti

Binomial name
- Aphotaenius cambeforti Chalumeau, 1983

Species of beetle

Aphotaenius cambeforti is a species of beetle of the family Scarabaeidae. It is found in Bolivia.

== Description ==
Adults reach a length of about 2.5–3.1 mm (0.098–0.122 in).

== Life history ==
Specimens have been collected in cow dung.
