= Euparixia boliviana =

Scientific classification
- Kingdom: Animalia
- Phylum: Arthropoda
- Clade: Pancrustacea
- Class: Insecta
- Order: Coleoptera
- Suborder: Polyphaga
- Infraorder: Scarabaeiformia
- Family: Scarabaeidae
- Genus: Euparixia
- Species: E. boliviana

Binomial name
- Euparixia boliviana Gordon & Mccleve, 2003

Species of beetle

Euparixia boliviana is a species of beetle of the family Scarabaeidae. It is found in Bolivia and Peru.

== Description ==
Adults reach a length of about 4.7 mm (0.19 in). They have an elongate, convex, feebly shiny, dark reddish brown body.

== Etymology ==
The species name refers to the country where the holotype was collected.
