= Ataeniopsis saxatilis =

Scientific classification
- Kingdom: Animalia
- Phylum: Arthropoda
- Clade: Pancrustacea
- Class: Insecta
- Order: Coleoptera
- Suborder: Polyphaga
- Infraorder: Scarabaeiformia
- Family: Scarabaeidae
- Genus: Ataeniopsis
- Species: A. saxatilis

Binomial name
- Ataeniopsis saxatilis (Cartwright, 1944)

Synonyms
- Ataenius saxatilis Cartwright, 1944

Species of beetle

Ataeniopsis saxatilis is a species of beetle of the family Scarabaeidae. It is found in the United States (Georgia, North Carolina, South Carolina).

== Description ==
Adults reach a length of about 3.5–4.6 mm (0.14–0.18 in). They have an oblong, convex, strongly shiny, piceous body, with the sides of the pronotum and legs dark castaneous.

== Life history ==
They have been collected in the sand and soil around weathered areas of granite and gneissic rocks.
