= Pseudataenius contortus =

Scientific classification
- Kingdom: Animalia
- Phylum: Arthropoda
- Clade: Pancrustacea
- Class: Insecta
- Order: Coleoptera
- Suborder: Polyphaga
- Infraorder: Scarabaeiformia
- Family: Scarabaeidae
- Genus: Pseudataenius
- Species: P. contortus

Binomial name
- Pseudataenius contortus Cartwright, 1974

Species of beetle

Pseudataenius contortus is a species of beetle of the family Scarabaeidae. It is found in the United States (Alabama, Delaware, Florida, Louisiana, Mississippi, New Jersey, South Carolina, Virginia).

== Description ==
Adults reach a length of about 4.6–5.1 mm (0.18–0.20 in). They have an elongate-oblong, shining, dark castaneous body, with testaceous antennae.
