= Parataenius brunneus =

Scientific classification
- Kingdom: Animalia
- Phylum: Arthropoda
- Clade: Pancrustacea
- Class: Insecta
- Order: Coleoptera
- Suborder: Polyphaga
- Infraorder: Scarabaeiformia
- Family: Scarabaeidae
- Genus: Parataenius
- Species: P. brunneus

Binomial name
- Parataenius brunneus (Schmidt, 1922)

Synonyms
- Ataenius brunneus Schmidt, 1922

Species of beetle

Parataenius brunneus is a species of beetle of the family Scarabaeidae. It is found in Argentina.

== Description ==
Adults reach a length of about 3.8–4.5 mm (0.15–0.18 in). They have a shiny, yellowish to rusty brown body.
