= Airapus bruxnerensis =

Scientific classification
- Kingdom: Animalia
- Phylum: Arthropoda
- Clade: Pancrustacea
- Class: Insecta
- Order: Coleoptera
- Suborder: Polyphaga
- Infraorder: Scarabaeiformia
- Family: Scarabaeidae
- Genus: Airapus
- Species: A. bruxnerensis

Binomial name
- Airapus bruxnerensis Stebnicka & Howden, 1996

Species of beetle

Airapus bruxnerensis is a species of beetle of the family Scarabaeidae. It is found in Australia (New South Wales).

== Description ==
Adults reach a length of about 3.5–4.1 mm (0.14–0.16 in). They have an alutaceous, almost mat, brownish-black to black body, partially covered with an argillaceous coating.
