= Haroldiataenius griffini =

Scientific classification
- Kingdom: Animalia
- Phylum: Arthropoda
- Clade: Pancrustacea
- Class: Insecta
- Order: Coleoptera
- Suborder: Polyphaga
- Infraorder: Scarabaeiformia
- Family: Scarabaeidae
- Genus: Haroldiataenius
- Species: H. griffini

Binomial name
- Haroldiataenius griffini (Cartwright, 1974)

Synonyms
- Ataenius griffini Cartwright, 1974

Species of beetle

Haroldiataenius griffini is a species of aphodiine dung beetle in the family Scarabaeidae. It is found in the United States (Texas).

== Description ==
Adults reach a length of about 3.5–3.7 mm (0.14–0.15 in). They have a dark reddish brown, shining body.

== Life history ==
Specimens have been collected in animal burrows, under cow dung, on sandy soils and in nests of leafcutter ants.
