= Oxyataenius =

Scientific classification
- Kingdom: Animalia
- Phylum: Arthropoda
- Clade: Pancrustacea
- Class: Insecta
- Order: Coleoptera
- Suborder: Polyphaga
- Infraorder: Scarabaeiformia
- Family: Scarabaeidae
- Subfamily: Aphodiinae
- Tribe: Eupariini
- Genus: Oxyataenius; Dellacasa & Stebnicka, 2001
- Species: O. morosus

Binomial name
- Oxyataenius morosus (Harold, 1869)

Synonyms
- Oxyomus morosus Harold, 1869

Genus of beetles

Oxyataenius is a genus of beetle of the family Scarabaeidae. It is monotypic, being represented by the single species, Oxyataenius morosus, which is found in Chile.

== Description ==
Adults reach a length of about 5 mm (0.20 in). They have a moderately shining, mostly piceous body, which is covered with setae. The elytra are dark brown, the legs brownish and the underside is reddish brown.
