= Cnematoplatys yorkensis =

Scientific classification
- Kingdom: Animalia
- Phylum: Arthropoda
- Clade: Pancrustacea
- Class: Insecta
- Order: Coleoptera
- Suborder: Polyphaga
- Infraorder: Scarabaeiformia
- Family: Scarabaeidae
- Genus: Cnematoplatys
- Species: C. yorkensis

Binomial name
- Cnematoplatys yorkensis Stebnicka, 2006

Species of beetle

Cnematoplatys yorkensis is a species of beetle of the family Scarabaeidae. It is found in Australia (Queensland).

== Description ==
Adults reach a length of about 4.5 mm (0.18 in). They have an elongate, parallel-sided glabrous, shining body. They are piceous above and castaneous ventrally.

== Etymology ==
The species name refers to the type locality, the Cape York Peninsula.
