= Lomanoxia ituensis =

Scientific classification
- Kingdom: Animalia
- Phylum: Arthropoda
- Clade: Pancrustacea
- Class: Insecta
- Order: Coleoptera
- Suborder: Polyphaga
- Infraorder: Scarabaeiformia
- Family: Scarabaeidae
- Genus: Lomanoxia
- Species: L. ituensis

Binomial name
- Lomanoxia ituensis Stebnicka, 1999

Species of beetle

Lomanoxia ituensis is a species of beetle of the family Scarabaeidae. It is found in Brazil (Mato Grosso do Sul, Minas Gerais, Rio de Janeiro, São Paulo).

== Description ==
Adults reach a length of about 5–5.2 mm (0.20–0.20 in). The head has minute granules and the clypeus is sinuate. The pronotum is setaceous, with the anterior angles expanded forward and the posterior margin without a medial lobe. The elytra have setaceous and flattened interstriae. On the abdomen, ventrites four and five are strigate.
