= Euparixia bruneri =

Scientific classification
- Kingdom: Animalia
- Phylum: Arthropoda
- Clade: Pancrustacea
- Class: Insecta
- Order: Coleoptera
- Suborder: Polyphaga
- Infraorder: Scarabaeiformia
- Family: Scarabaeidae
- Genus: Euparixia
- Species: E. bruneri

Binomial name
- Euparixia bruneri Chapin, 1940

Species of beetle

Euparixia bruneri is a species of beetle of the family Scarabaeidae. It is found in Cuba.

== Description ==
Adults reach a length of about 5.25 mm (0.207 in). They have an elongate, convex, feebly shining (often encrusted with reddish dirt), reddish brown body.

== Life history ==
The host is Atta insularis.
