= Airapus pygidialis =

Scientific classification
- Kingdom: Animalia
- Phylum: Arthropoda
- Clade: Pancrustacea
- Class: Insecta
- Order: Coleoptera
- Suborder: Polyphaga
- Infraorder: Scarabaeiformia
- Family: Scarabaeidae
- Genus: Airapus
- Species: A. pygidialis

Binomial name
- Airapus pygidialis (Lea, 1923)

Synonyms
- Saprosites pygidialis Lea, 1923

Species of beetle

Airapus pygidialis is a species of beetle of the family Scarabaeidae. It is found in Australia (New South Wales, Queensland).

== Description ==
Adults reach a length of about 4.8–5 mm (0.19–0.20 in). They have an opaque, reddish-brown to dark brown body, which is partially covered with an argillaceous coating. The club of the antennae is orange-yellow.
