= Selviria (beetle) =

Scientific classification
- Kingdom: Animalia
- Phylum: Arthropoda
- Clade: Pancrustacea
- Class: Insecta
- Order: Coleoptera
- Suborder: Polyphaga
- Infraorder: Scarabaeiformia
- Family: Scarabaeidae
- Tribe: Eupariini
- Genus: Selviria; Stebnicka, 1999

Genus of beetles

Selviria is a genus of aphodiine dung beetles in the family Scarabaeidae. There are at least two described species in Selviria, both found in Brazil. Selviria matogrossoensis has been reported in a nest of fire ants.

== Species ==
These two species belong to the genus Selviria:

- Selviria anneae Stebnicka, 2005^{c g}
- Selviria matogrossoensis Stebnicka, 1999^{c g}

Data sources: i = ITIS, c = Catalogue of Life, g = GBIF, b = Bugguide.net
