= Airapus lamingtonensis =

Scientific classification
- Kingdom: Animalia
- Phylum: Arthropoda
- Clade: Pancrustacea
- Class: Insecta
- Order: Coleoptera
- Suborder: Polyphaga
- Infraorder: Scarabaeiformia
- Family: Scarabaeidae
- Genus: Airapus
- Species: A. lamingtonensis

Binomial name
- Airapus lamingtonensis Minkina & Bellmann, 2023

Species of beetle

Airapus lamingtonensis is a species of beetle of the family Scarabaeidae. It is found in Papua New Guinea.

== Description ==
Adults reach a length of about 3.8 mm (0.15 in). They have an elongate, convex, shiny, brownish body, with light brownish legs and with the tibiae, tarsi and antennae yellowish.

== Etymology ==
The species is named after Mount Lamington, were the holotype was collected.
