= Saprovisca leytensis =

Scientific classification
- Kingdom: Animalia
- Phylum: Arthropoda
- Clade: Pancrustacea
- Class: Insecta
- Order: Coleoptera
- Suborder: Polyphaga
- Infraorder: Scarabaeiformia
- Family: Scarabaeidae
- Genus: Saprovisca
- Species: S. leytensis

Binomial name
- Saprovisca leytensis Stebnicka, 1993

Species of beetle

Saprovisca leytensis is a species of beetle of the family Scarabaeidae. It is found in the Philippines (Leyte).

== Description ==
Adults reach a length of about 6.9 mm (0.27 in). They have an elongate, shining, glabrous, carbon black body, with the antennae and palpi brown.
