= Ataeniopsis pusillus =

Scientific classification
- Kingdom: Animalia
- Phylum: Arthropoda
- Clade: Pancrustacea
- Class: Insecta
- Order: Coleoptera
- Suborder: Polyphaga
- Infraorder: Scarabaeiformia
- Family: Scarabaeidae
- Genus: Ataeniopsis
- Species: A. pusillus

Binomial name
- Ataeniopsis pusillus (Burmeister, 1877)

Synonyms
- Euparia pusilla Burmeister, 1877

Species of beetle

Ataeniopsis pusillus is a species of beetle of the family Scarabaeidae. It is found in Argentina, Bolivia, Paraguay and Uruguay.

== Description ==
Adults reach a length of about 3.5–3.8 mm (0.14–0.15 in). They have a piceous body, with the legs lighter.

== Life history ==
They have been collected in suburban grassland areas, riverine forests and tropical transition forests.
