= Haroldiataenius lucanus =

Scientific classification
- Kingdom: Animalia
- Phylum: Arthropoda
- Clade: Pancrustacea
- Class: Insecta
- Order: Coleoptera
- Suborder: Polyphaga
- Infraorder: Scarabaeiformia
- Family: Scarabaeidae
- Genus: Haroldiataenius
- Species: H. lucanus

Binomial name
- Haroldiataenius lucanus (Horn, 1871)

Synonyms
- Ataenius lucanus Horn, 1871; Ataenius sabinoi Cartwright, 1974

Species of beetle

Haroldiataenius lucanus is a species of beetle of the family Scarabaeidae. It is found in Mexico (Baja California Sur) and the United States (Arizona)

== Description ==
Adults reach a length of about 3.3–3.5 mm (0.13–0.14 in). They have a dark red-brown, shining body.

== Life history ==
Specimens have been collected in low desert areas.
