= Saprovisca =

Scientific classification
- Kingdom: Animalia
- Phylum: Arthropoda
- Clade: Pancrustacea
- Class: Insecta
- Order: Coleoptera
- Suborder: Polyphaga
- Infraorder: Scarabaeiformia
- Family: Scarabaeidae
- Subfamily: Aphodiinae
- Tribe: Eupariini
- Genus: Saprovisca; Stebnicka, 1993

Genus of beetles

Saprovisca is a genus of beetles of the family Scarabaeidae.

== Species ==
- Saprovisca leytensis Stebnicka, 1993
- Saprovisca sarangay Skelley, 2015
