= Australammoecius coloratus =

Scientific classification
- Kingdom: Animalia
- Phylum: Arthropoda
- Clade: Pancrustacea
- Class: Insecta
- Order: Coleoptera
- Suborder: Polyphaga
- Infraorder: Scarabaeiformia
- Family: Scarabaeidae
- Genus: Australammoecius
- Species: A. coloratus

Binomial name
- Australammoecius coloratus (Blackburn, 1904)

Synonyms
- Ataenius coloratus Blackburn, 1904; Australammoecius demarzi Petrovitz, 1958

Species of beetle

Australammoecius coloratus is a species of beetle of the family Scarabaeidae. It is found in Australia (Western Australia).

== Description ==
Adults reach a length of about 3.2–5 mm (0.13–0.20 in). They have an elongate-oval, alutaceous, slightly shining, rusty brown to dark castaneous body, sometimes with the sides of the pronotum reddish or the elytra lighter than the head and pronotum or the elytra partly red.
