= Haroldiataenius semipilosus =

Scientific classification
- Kingdom: Animalia
- Phylum: Arthropoda
- Clade: Pancrustacea
- Class: Insecta
- Order: Coleoptera
- Suborder: Polyphaga
- Infraorder: Scarabaeiformia
- Family: Scarabaeidae
- Genus: Haroldiataenius
- Species: H. semipilosus

Binomial name
- Haroldiataenius semipilosus (Van Dyke, 1928)

Synonyms
- Ataenius semipilosus Van Dyke, 1928

Species of beetle

Haroldiataenius semipilosus is a species of aphodiine dung beetle in the family Scarabaeidae. It is found in Mexico (Sonora) and the United States (Arizona, Texas)

== Description ==
Adults reach a length of about 3.2–4.2 mm (0.13–0.17 in). They have a dark castaneous, shiny body.

== Life history ==
Some specimens have been collected in Neotoma nests.
