= Setylaides punctatus =

Scientific classification
- Kingdom: Animalia
- Phylum: Arthropoda
- Clade: Pancrustacea
- Class: Insecta
- Order: Coleoptera
- Suborder: Polyphaga
- Infraorder: Scarabaeiformia
- Family: Scarabaeidae
- Genus: Setylaides
- Species: S. punctatus

Binomial name
- Setylaides punctatus (Schmidt, 1911)

Synonyms
- Dialytes punctatus Schmidt, 1911

Species of beetle

Setylaides punctatus is a species of beetle of the family Scarabaeidae. It is found in India (Andaman Islands).

== Description ==
Adults reach a length of about 5 mm (0.20 in). They have an elongate, black body, with the elytra sometimes spotted.
