= Euparixoides tachirensis =

Scientific classification
- Kingdom: Animalia
- Phylum: Arthropoda
- Clade: Pancrustacea
- Class: Insecta
- Order: Coleoptera
- Suborder: Polyphaga
- Infraorder: Scarabaeiformia
- Family: Scarabaeidae
- Genus: Euparixoides
- Species: E. tachirensis

Binomial name
- Euparixoides tachirensis Stebnicka & Skelley, 2005

Species of beetle

Euparixoides tachirensis is a species of beetle of the family Scarabaeidae. It is found in Colombia and Venezuela.

== Description ==
Adults reach a length of about 3.9–4 mm (0.15–0.16 in). They have an elongate, convex, subopaque, setigerous, piceous body, with the margins of the clypeus, sides of the pronotum and legs reddish-brown.

== Etymology ==
The species name refers to the type locality, Tachira.
