= Ataeniopsis carupanoi =

Scientific classification
- Kingdom: Animalia
- Phylum: Arthropoda
- Clade: Pancrustacea
- Class: Insecta
- Order: Coleoptera
- Suborder: Polyphaga
- Infraorder: Scarabaeiformia
- Family: Scarabaeidae
- Genus: Ataeniopsis
- Species: A. carupanoi

Binomial name
- Ataeniopsis carupanoi Stebnicka, 2003

Species of beetle

Ataeniopsis carupanoi is a species of beetle of the family Scarabaeidae. It is found in Venezuela.

== Description ==
Adults reach a length of about 3.2–3.6 mm (0.13–0.14 in). They have a slender, reddish-black body, with the legs somewhat lighter.

== Etymology ==
The species name is derived from the type locality, Carupano.
