= Passaliolla eugastrica =

Scientific classification
- Kingdom: Animalia
- Phylum: Arthropoda
- Clade: Pancrustacea
- Class: Insecta
- Order: Coleoptera
- Suborder: Polyphaga
- Infraorder: Scarabaeiformia
- Family: Scarabaeidae
- Genus: Passaliolla
- Species: P. eugastrica

Binomial name
- Passaliolla eugastrica (Harold, 1869)

Synonyms
- Saprosites eugastricus Harold, 1869

Species of beetle

Passaliolla eugastrica is a species of beetle of the family Scarabaeidae. It is found in Argentina, Brazil (Espírito Santo, Minas Gerais, Rio de Janeiro, Santa Catarina) and Ecuador.

== Description ==
Adults reach a length of about 2.8–3.2 mm (0.11–0.13 in). The head is without granules and the clypeus is subrugosely punctate medially. The pronotum has punctures of two sizes, fine and coarse, which are densely distributed everywhere. The elytra have deep striae and are coarsely punctured.

== Life history ==
Specimens have been found inside rotting logs.
