= Ataeniopsis rugopygus =

Scientific classification
- Kingdom: Animalia
- Phylum: Arthropoda
- Clade: Pancrustacea
- Class: Insecta
- Order: Coleoptera
- Suborder: Polyphaga
- Infraorder: Scarabaeiformia
- Family: Scarabaeidae
- Genus: Ataeniopsis
- Species: A. rugopygus

Binomial name
- Ataeniopsis rugopygus (Cartwright, 1974)

Synonyms
- Ataenius rugopygus Cartwright, 1974

Species of beetle

Ataeniopsis rugopygus is a species of beetle of the family Scarabaeidae. It is found in the United States (Arizona, Colorado, New Mexico, Texas) and Mexico (Chihuahua, Durango).

== Description ==
Adults reach a length of about 4–4.3 mm (0.16–0.17 in). They have an elongate, parallel, strongly shiny, piceous body, with the legs usually lighter.
