= Euparixia panamaensis =

Scientific classification
- Kingdom: Animalia
- Phylum: Arthropoda
- Clade: Pancrustacea
- Class: Insecta
- Order: Coleoptera
- Suborder: Polyphaga
- Infraorder: Scarabaeiformia
- Family: Scarabaeidae
- Genus: Euparixia
- Species: E. panamaensis

Binomial name
- Euparixia panamaensis Gordon & Mccleve, 2003

Species of beetle

Euparixia panamaensis is a species of beetle of the family Scarabaeidae. It is found in Panama.

== Description ==
Adults reach a length of about 4.6 mm (0.18 in). They have an elongate, convex, shiny, dark red body.

== Etymology ==
The species is named for the country where the type specimen was collected.
