= Airapus jenisi =

Scientific classification
- Kingdom: Animalia
- Phylum: Arthropoda
- Clade: Pancrustacea
- Class: Insecta
- Order: Coleoptera
- Suborder: Polyphaga
- Infraorder: Scarabaeiformia
- Family: Scarabaeidae
- Genus: Airapus
- Species: A. jenisi

Binomial name
- Airapus jenisi Král, Mencl & Rakovič, 2019

Species of beetle

Airapus jenisi is a species of beetle of the family Scarabaeidae. It is found in peninsular Malaysia (Sabah) and Indonesia (East Kalimantan).

== Description ==
Adults reach a length of about 5–5.5 mm (0.20–0.22 in). They have an oblong oval, subparallel, moderately convex and moderately shining, mostly black body, with the margin of the clypeus and part of the anteromedial area of the head brownish.

== Etymology ==
The species is named after Ivo Jeniš, who provided the authors with the type material.
