= Cnematoplatys cylindrica =

Scientific classification
- Kingdom: Animalia
- Phylum: Arthropoda
- Clade: Pancrustacea
- Class: Insecta
- Order: Coleoptera
- Suborder: Polyphaga
- Infraorder: Scarabaeiformia
- Family: Scarabaeidae
- Genus: Cnematoplatys
- Species: C. cylindrica

Binomial name
- Cnematoplatys cylindrica (Endrödi, 1951)

Synonyms
- Neosaprosites cylindricus Endrödi, 1951; Saprosites gressitti Cartwright & Gordon, 1971

Species of beetle

Cnematoplatys cylindrica is a species of beetle of the family Scarabaeidae. It is found in Papua New Guinea, the Solomon Islands and Palau Island.

== Description ==
Adults reach a length of about 4.5–5 mm (0.18–0.20 in). They have an elongate, moderately shining, dark castaneous body. The sides and apex of elytra have tiny pubescence.
