= Parataenius selvae =

Scientific classification
- Kingdom: Animalia
- Phylum: Arthropoda
- Clade: Pancrustacea
- Class: Insecta
- Order: Coleoptera
- Suborder: Polyphaga
- Infraorder: Scarabaeiformia
- Family: Scarabaeidae
- Genus: Parataenius
- Species: P. selvae

Binomial name
- Parataenius selvae Stebnicka & Skelley, 2009

Species of beetle

Parataenius selvae is a species of beetle of the family Scarabaeidae. It is found in Argentina and Bolivia.

== Description ==
Adults reach a length of about 3.5–4 mm (0.14–0.16 in). They have a shiny, yellowish to rusty brown body.

== Etymology ==
The species name is derived from the type locality, Rio Selva in Bolivia.
