= Setylaides tsujii =

Scientific classification
- Kingdom: Animalia
- Phylum: Arthropoda
- Clade: Pancrustacea
- Class: Insecta
- Order: Coleoptera
- Suborder: Polyphaga
- Infraorder: Scarabaeiformia
- Family: Scarabaeidae
- Genus: Setylaides
- Species: S. tsujii

Binomial name
- Setylaides tsujii Kakizoe, Kawahara & Ochi, 2021

Species of beetle

Setylaides tsujii is a species of beetle of the family Scarabaeidae. It is found in Japan (Tsushima Island).

== Description ==
Adults reach a length of about 4.36–4.65 mm (0.172–0.183 in). They have an elongate oval, robust, strongly convex body. The head and pronotum are shiny, black and glabrous. The elytra are glabrous, and covered with a greyish opalescent coating.

== Life history ==
Specimens have been collected under the bark of fallen logs in laurel forests.

== Etymology ==
The species is named in honour of Mr. Naomichi Tsuji, who collected the holotype.
