= Parataenius =

Scientific classification
- Kingdom: Animalia
- Phylum: Arthropoda
- Clade: Pancrustacea
- Class: Insecta
- Order: Coleoptera
- Suborder: Polyphaga
- Infraorder: Scarabaeiformia
- Family: Scarabaeidae
- Tribe: Eupariini
- Genus: Parataenius; Balthasar, 1961

Synonyms
- Brancoataenius Paulian, 1979

Genus of beetles

Parataenius is a genus of aphodiine dung beetles in the family Scarabaeidae. There are about six described species in Parataenius.

== Species ==
These six species belong to the genus Parataenius:

- Parataenius brunneus (Schmidt, 1922)
- Parataenius derbesis (Solier, 1851)
- Parataenius estero Stebnicka & Skelley, 2009
- Parataenius martinezi Stebnicka & Skelley, 2009
- Parataenius selvae Stebnicka & Skelley, 2009
- Parataenius simulator (Harold, 1868)
