= Euparixia =

Scientific classification
- Kingdom: Animalia
- Phylum: Arthropoda
- Clade: Pancrustacea
- Class: Insecta
- Order: Coleoptera
- Suborder: Polyphaga
- Infraorder: Scarabaeiformia
- Family: Scarabaeidae
- Tribe: Eupariini
- Genus: Euparixia; Brown, 1927

Genus of beetles

Euparixia is a genus of aphodiine dung beetles in the family Scarabaeidae. There are about 10 described species in Euparixia.

== Species ==
These 10 species belong to the genus Euparixia:

- Euparixia boliviana Gordon & Mccleve, 2003
- Euparixia bruneri Chapin, 1940
- Euparixia campbelli Gordon & Mccleve, 2003
- Euparixia costaricensis Hinton, 1936
- Euparixia duncani Brown, 1927
- Euparixia formica Hinton, 1934
- Euparixia isthmia Gordon & Mccleve, 2003
- Euparixia mexicana Gordon & McCleve, 2003
- Euparixia moseri Woodruff & Cartwright, 1967
- Euparixia panamaensis Gordon & Mccleve, 2003
