= Lomanoxoides herediae =

Scientific classification
- Kingdom: Animalia
- Phylum: Arthropoda
- Clade: Pancrustacea
- Class: Insecta
- Order: Coleoptera
- Suborder: Polyphaga
- Infraorder: Scarabaeiformia
- Family: Scarabaeidae
- Genus: Lomanoxoides
- Species: L. herediae

Binomial name
- Lomanoxoides herediae Stebnicka & Skelley, 2005

Species of beetle

Lomanoxoides herediae is a species of beetle of the family Scarabaeidae. It is found in Costa Rica and Honduras.

== Description ==
Adults reach a length of about 4–4.1 mm (0.16–0.16 in). They have an oblong oval, convex, shiny, carbon black body, with piceous legs.

== Etymology ==
The species name refers to the type locality of the paratype, Heredia.
