= Pseudataenius gracilitarsis =

Scientific classification
- Kingdom: Animalia
- Phylum: Arthropoda
- Clade: Pancrustacea
- Class: Insecta
- Order: Coleoptera
- Suborder: Polyphaga
- Infraorder: Scarabaeiformia
- Family: Scarabaeidae
- Genus: Pseudataenius
- Species: P. gracilitarsis

Binomial name
- Pseudataenius gracilitarsis (Petrovitz, 1973)

Synonyms
- Ataenioides gracilitarsis Petrovitz, 1973

Species of beetle

Pseudataenius gracilitarsis is a species of beetle of the family Scarabaeidae. It is found in Bolivia and Brazil (Bahia, Distrito Federal, Goiás, Minas Gerais, Pernambuco, São Paulo).

== Description ==
Adults reach a length of about 4.2–4.8 mm (0.17–0.19 in). The clypeus is sinuate and the frons is coarsely punctate. The pronotum is not fringed with setae, but has a marginal line and sinuate posterior angles. The elytra have glossy and punctate interstriae.
