= Paraplesiataenius =

- Paraplesiataenius genieri

Scientific classification
- Kingdom: Animalia
- Phylum: Arthropoda
- Clade: Pancrustacea
- Class: Insecta
- Order: Coleoptera
- Suborder: Polyphaga
- Infraorder: Scarabaeiformia
- Family: Scarabaeidae
- Subfamily: Aphodiinae
- Tribe: Eupariini
- Genus: Paraplesiataenius; Chalumeau, 1992

Genus of beetles

Paraplesiataenius is a genus of beetles of the family Scarabaeidae.

== Species ==
- Paraplesiataenius catarinaensis Stebnicka, 2003
- Paraplesiataenius genieri Stebnicka, 2003
- Paraplesiataenius tremolerasi (Schmidt, 1910)
