= Iguazua costaricensis =

Scientific classification
- Kingdom: Animalia
- Phylum: Arthropoda
- Clade: Pancrustacea
- Class: Insecta
- Order: Coleoptera
- Suborder: Polyphaga
- Infraorder: Scarabaeiformia
- Family: Scarabaeidae
- Genus: Iguazua
- Species: I. costaricensis

Binomial name
- Iguazua costaricensis Stebnicka & Skelley, 2005

Species of beetle

Iguazua costaricensis is a species of beetle of the family Scarabaeidae. It is found in Costa Rica.

== Description ==
Adults reach a length of about 2.8–3 mm (0.11–0.12 in). They have an elongate-oval, convex, opaque, glabrous, dark brown body.
