= Australammoecius persimilis =

Scientific classification
- Kingdom: Animalia
- Phylum: Arthropoda
- Clade: Pancrustacea
- Class: Insecta
- Order: Coleoptera
- Suborder: Polyphaga
- Infraorder: Scarabaeiformia
- Family: Scarabaeidae
- Genus: Australammoecius
- Species: A. persimilis

Binomial name
- Australammoecius persimilis (Lea, 1923)

Synonyms
- Ataenius persimilis Lea, 1923; Australammoecius australis Petrovitz, 1961; Australammoecius bicolor Petrovitz, 1961; Australammoecius brunneus Petrovitz, 1961; Australammoecius granuliceps Petrovitz, 1961

Species of beetle

Australammoecius persimilis is a species of beetle of the family Scarabaeidae. It is found in Australia (north-western Australia, Northern Territory, Queensland).

== Description ==
Adults reach a length of about 3–4.5 mm (0.12–0.18 in). They have a sub-oval, subopaque, rusty brown to dark castaneous body, sometimes with the elytra lighter than the fore body. They are highly variable. Variations occur in colour, but also in the sculpture of the head, pronotum and elytra.
