= Parataenius martinezi =

Scientific classification
- Kingdom: Animalia
- Phylum: Arthropoda
- Clade: Pancrustacea
- Class: Insecta
- Order: Coleoptera
- Suborder: Polyphaga
- Infraorder: Scarabaeiformia
- Family: Scarabaeidae
- Genus: Parataenius
- Species: P. martinezi

Binomial name
- Parataenius martinezi Stebnicka & Skelley, 2009

Species of beetle

Parataenius martinezi is a species of beetle of the family Scarabaeidae. It is found in Argentina and Paraguay.

== Description ==
Adults reach a length of about 4.5–5 mm (0.18–0.20 in). They have a shiny, dark castaneous body.

== Etymology ==
The species is named after the Argentinian entomologist Antonio Martínez.
