= Ataeniopsis =

Scientific classification
- Kingdom: Animalia
- Phylum: Arthropoda
- Clade: Pancrustacea
- Class: Insecta
- Order: Coleoptera
- Suborder: Polyphaga
- Infraorder: Scarabaeiformia
- Family: Scarabaeidae
- Tribe: Eupariini
- Genus: Ataeniopsis; Petrovitz, 1973

Genus of beetles

Ataeniopsis is a genus of aphodiine dung beetles in the family Scarabaeidae. There are about 15 described species in Ataeniopsis.

== Species ==
These 15 species belong to the genus Ataeniopsis:

- Ataeniopsis armasi (Chalumeau, 1982)
- Ataeniopsis carupanoi Stebnicka, 2003
- Ataeniopsis duncani (Cartwright, 1974)
- Ataeniopsis edistoi (Cartwright, 1974)
- Ataeniopsis figurator (Harold, 1874)
- Ataeniopsis haroldi (Steinheil, 1872)
- Ataeniopsis jaltipani Stebnicka, 2003
- Ataeniopsis notabilis Petrovitz, 1973
- Ataeniopsis parallelus (Petrovitz, 1961)
- Ataeniopsis parkeri (Cartwright, 1974)
- Ataeniopsis pusillus (Burmeister, 1877)
- Ataeniopsis regulus (Balthasar, 1947)
- Ataeniopsis rugopygus (Cartwright, 1974)
- Ataeniopsis saxatilis (Cartwright, 1944)
- Ataeniopsis vinacoensis Stebnicka, 2003
