= Arupaia =

Scientific classification
- Kingdom: Animalia
- Phylum: Arthropoda
- Clade: Pancrustacea
- Class: Insecta
- Order: Coleoptera
- Suborder: Polyphaga
- Infraorder: Scarabaeiformia
- Family: Scarabaeidae
- Subfamily: Aphodiinae
- Tribe: Eupariini
- Genus: Arupaia; Stebnicka, 1999
- Species: A. friedenreichi

Binomial name
- Arupaia friedenreichi (Harold, 1870)

Synonyms
- Euparia friedenreichi Harold, 1870; Iarupea guimaraesi Martinez, 1955

Genus of beetles

Arupaia is a genus of beetle of the family Scarabaeidae. It is monotypic, being represented by the single species, Arupaia friedenreichi, which is found in Brazil (Distrito Federal, Minas Gerais, Rio de Janeiro, Rio Grande do Sul, Santa Catarina, São Paulo).

== Description ==
Adults reach a length of about 5.5–6 mm (0.22–0.24 in). The body is elongate and dark reddish brown. The head is wide and the clypeus is longitudinally wrinkled, and strongly gibbous. The pronotum is wide, with large and oval punctures and with the lateral margins straight, explanate and furrowed. The posterior margin has a deep groove. The elytra are apically glabrous and the fifth interstriae has an anterior tubercle and the fifth stria is grooved anteriorly. The legs are elongate and slender.

== Life history ==
Specimens have been collected in the nests of Solenopsis geminata.
