= Cnematoplatys tozerensis =

Scientific classification
- Kingdom: Animalia
- Phylum: Arthropoda
- Clade: Pancrustacea
- Class: Insecta
- Order: Coleoptera
- Suborder: Polyphaga
- Infraorder: Scarabaeiformia
- Family: Scarabaeidae
- Genus: Cnematoplatys
- Species: C. tozerensis

Binomial name
- Cnematoplatys tozerensis Stebnicka & Howden, 1996

Species of beetle

Cnematoplatys tozerensis is a species of beetle of the family Scarabaeidae. It is found in Australia (Queensland).

== Description ==
Adults reach a length of about 4.5–5 mm (0.18–0.20 in). They have a parallel-sided, shining, reddish to dark castaneous body. The club of the antennae is yellowish and the upper surface is covered with very short, scarce setae.
