= Paraplesiataenius catarinaensis =

Scientific classification
- Kingdom: Animalia
- Phylum: Arthropoda
- Clade: Pancrustacea
- Class: Insecta
- Order: Coleoptera
- Suborder: Polyphaga
- Infraorder: Scarabaeiformia
- Family: Scarabaeidae
- Genus: Paraplesiataenius
- Species: P. catarinaensis

Binomial name
- Paraplesiataenius catarinaensis Stebnicka, 2003

Species of beetle

Paraplesiataenius catarinaensis is a species of beetle of the family Scarabaeidae. It is found in Brazil (Paraná, Rio Grande do Sul, Santa Catarina).

== Description ==
Adults reach a length of about 4.2–5.5 mm (0.17–0.22 in). The body is piceous, sometimes with light elytra. The head is punctate with fine punctures. The pronotum has fine, dense punctures similar to those of the head, but also larger coarser punctures mixed with the fine ones. The elytra are glabrous dorsally and the interstriae have small setae near the posterior margin. The lateral margin is fringed with setae.

== Life history ==
Specimens have been found in detritus piles of Acromyrmex ants.
