= Airapus vangviengensis =

Scientific classification
- Kingdom: Animalia
- Phylum: Arthropoda
- Clade: Pancrustacea
- Class: Insecta
- Order: Coleoptera
- Suborder: Polyphaga
- Infraorder: Scarabaeiformia
- Family: Scarabaeidae
- Genus: Airapus
- Species: A. vangviengensis

Binomial name
- Airapus vangviengensis Minkina & Bellmann, 2023

Species of beetle

Airapus vangviengensis is a species of beetle of the family Scarabaeidae. It is found in Laos.

== Description ==
Adults reach a length of about 4.9 mm (0.19 in). They have an elongate, convex, moderately shiny, brownish body, with light brownish legs and with the tibiae, tarsi and antennae yellowish.

== Etymology ==
The species is named after the city of Vang Vieng, where the type specimens were collected.
