= Euparia =

Scientific classification
- Kingdom: Animalia
- Phylum: Arthropoda
- Clade: Pancrustacea
- Class: Insecta
- Order: Coleoptera
- Suborder: Polyphaga
- Infraorder: Scarabaeiformia
- Family: Scarabaeidae
- Tribe: Eupariini
- Genus: Euparia; LePeletier & Serville, 1828

Synonyms
- Auperia Jacquelin du Val, 1857

Genus of beetles

Euparia is a genus of aphodiine dung beetles in the family Scarabaeidae. There are about six described species in Euparia.

== Species ==
These six species belong to the genus Euparia:

- Euparia africana Schmidt, 1909
- Euparia ambrymensis Paulian, 1941
- Euparia baraudi Chalumeau & Gruner, 1974
- Euparia castanea LePeletier & Serville, 1828
- Euparia consimilis Balthasar, 1945
- Euparia mirabilis (Balthasar, 1945)
