= Australammoecius aphodioides =

Scientific classification
- Kingdom: Animalia
- Phylum: Arthropoda
- Clade: Pancrustacea
- Class: Insecta
- Order: Coleoptera
- Suborder: Polyphaga
- Infraorder: Scarabaeiformia
- Family: Scarabaeidae
- Genus: Australammoecius
- Species: A. aphodioides

Binomial name
- Australammoecius aphodioides (Lea, 1923)

Synonyms
- Ataenius aphodioides Lea, 1923

Species of beetle

Australammoecius aphodioides is a species of beetle of the family Scarabaeidae. It is found in Australia (Western Australia).

== Description ==
Adults reach a length of about 4.5–4.8 mm (0.18–0.19 in). They have an elongate-oval, shining, reddish body, with the elytra lighter than the pronotum.
