= Lomanoxia =

Scientific classification
- Kingdom: Animalia
- Phylum: Arthropoda
- Clade: Pancrustacea
- Class: Insecta
- Order: Coleoptera
- Suborder: Polyphaga
- Infraorder: Scarabaeiformia
- Family: Scarabaeidae
- Subfamily: Aphodiinae
- Tribe: Eupariini
- Genus: Lomanoxia; Martinez, 1951

Genus of beetles

Lomanoxia is a genus of beetles of the family Scarabaeidae.

== Species ==
- Lomanoxia alternata Krikken, 1972
- Lomanoxia canthonopsis Skelley, 2003
- Lomanoxia chacocola Krikken, 1972
- Lomanoxia costulata (Harold, 1867)
- Lomanoxia ituensis Stebnicka, 1999
- Lomanoxia melloi Stebnicka, 1999
- Lomanoxia ovalis (Schmidt, 1911)
