= Parataenius estero =

Scientific classification
- Kingdom: Animalia
- Phylum: Arthropoda
- Clade: Pancrustacea
- Class: Insecta
- Order: Coleoptera
- Suborder: Polyphaga
- Infraorder: Scarabaeiformia
- Family: Scarabaeidae
- Genus: Parataenius
- Species: P. estero

Binomial name
- Parataenius estero Stebnicka & Skelley, 2009

Species of beetle

Parataenius estero is a species of beetle of the family Scarabaeidae. It is found in Argentina.

== Description ==
Adults reach a length of about 3.5–3.6 mm (0.14–0.14 in). They have a stout, convex, shiny black body.

== Etymology ==
The species name is derived from the type locality, Santiago del Estero.
