= Airapus burrundieae =

Scientific classification
- Kingdom: Animalia
- Phylum: Arthropoda
- Clade: Pancrustacea
- Class: Insecta
- Order: Coleoptera
- Suborder: Polyphaga
- Infraorder: Scarabaeiformia
- Family: Scarabaeidae
- Genus: Airapus
- Species: A. burrundieae

Binomial name
- Airapus burrundieae Stebnicka & Howden, 1996

Species of beetle

Airapus burrundieae is a species of beetle of the family Scarabaeidae. It is found in Australia (Queensland), Papua New Guinea and Indonesia (Irian Jaya).

== Description ==
Adults reach a length of about 5–5.2 mm (0.20–0.20 in). They have a shining, reddish to dark castaneous body.
