= Haroldiataenius mariarum =

Scientific classification
- Kingdom: Animalia
- Phylum: Arthropoda
- Clade: Pancrustacea
- Class: Insecta
- Order: Coleoptera
- Suborder: Polyphaga
- Infraorder: Scarabaeiformia
- Family: Scarabaeidae
- Genus: Haroldiataenius
- Species: H. mariarum

Binomial name
- Haroldiataenius mariarum (Bates, 1887)

Synonyms
- Ataenius mariarum Bates, 1887; Ataenius perpolitus Schmidt, 1917

Species of beetle

Haroldiataenius mariarum is a species of beetle of the family Scarabaeidae. It is found in Mexico (Colima, Guerrero, Michoacán, Nayarit, Oaxaca, Sinaloa, Sonora) and Panama.

== Description ==
Adults reach a length of about 4.5–5 mm (0.18–0.20 in). They have an oval, strongly convex, castaneous and shining body.
