= Ataeniopsis jaltipani =

Scientific classification
- Kingdom: Animalia
- Phylum: Arthropoda
- Clade: Pancrustacea
- Class: Insecta
- Order: Coleoptera
- Suborder: Polyphaga
- Infraorder: Scarabaeiformia
- Family: Scarabaeidae
- Genus: Ataeniopsis
- Species: A. jaltipani

Binomial name
- Ataeniopsis jaltipani Stebnicka, 2003

Species of beetle

Ataeniopsis jaltipani is a species of beetle of the family Scarabaeidae. It is found in Mexico (Oaxaca, Veracruz).

== Description ==
Adults reach a length of about 3.2–3.8 mm (0.13–0.15 in). They have a parallel-sided, reddish-black to black body, with the legs usually lighter than the undersurface.

== Etymology ==
The species name is derived from the type locality, Jaltipan.
