= Euparixia formica =

Scientific classification
- Kingdom: Animalia
- Phylum: Arthropoda
- Clade: Pancrustacea
- Class: Insecta
- Order: Coleoptera
- Suborder: Polyphaga
- Infraorder: Scarabaeiformia
- Family: Scarabaeidae
- Genus: Euparixia
- Species: E. formica

Binomial name
- Euparixia formica Hinton, 1934

Species of beetle

Euparixia formica is a species of beetle of the family Scarabaeidae. It is found in Mexico (Chiapas, Guerrero, México).

== Description ==
Adults reach a length of about 4.65 mm (0.183 in). They have an elongate, convex, feebly shining, dark reddish brown body.
