= Lomanoxia canthonopsis =

Scientific classification
- Kingdom: Animalia
- Phylum: Arthropoda
- Clade: Pancrustacea
- Class: Insecta
- Order: Coleoptera
- Suborder: Polyphaga
- Infraorder: Scarabaeiformia
- Family: Scarabaeidae
- Genus: Lomanoxia
- Species: L. canthonopsis

Binomial name
- Lomanoxia canthonopsis Skelley, 2003

Species of beetle

Lomanoxia canthonopsis is a species of beetle of the family Scarabaeidae. It is found in Bolivia, Brazil (Rondônia), Colombia, Costa Rica, French Guiana, Suriname and Trinidad & Tobago.

== Description ==
Adults reach a length of about 4.8–5 mm (0.19–0.20 in). The body is extremely broad and the head is minutely granulated, with the clypeus emarginate. The pronotum is setaceous, with the anterior angles expanded forward and the posterior margin without a lobe. The elytra are wider than the pronotum. On the abdomen, only the fifth ventrite is strigate anteriorly.

== Life history ==
Specimens have been found inside the nests of Atta species, including those of Atta cephalotes.
