= Aphotaenius gaucho =

Scientific classification
- Kingdom: Animalia
- Phylum: Arthropoda
- Clade: Pancrustacea
- Class: Insecta
- Order: Coleoptera
- Suborder: Polyphaga
- Infraorder: Scarabaeiformia
- Family: Scarabaeidae
- Genus: Aphotaenius
- Species: A. gaucho

Binomial name
- Aphotaenius gaucho Skelley & Vaz-de-Mello, 2020

Species of beetle

Aphotaenius gaucho is a species of beetle of the family Scarabaeidae. It is found in Brazil (Rio Grande do Sul).

== Description ==
Adults reach a length of about 2.5 mm (0.098 in). The head has scarce and fine punctures and the lateral angles to the clypeal emargination are rounded. The pronotum has punctures of two sizes. These small and big punctures are uniformly and densely distributed across the pronotal surface. The elytral interstriae have fine punctures.

== Life history ==
They are attracted to bovine feces.

== Etymology ==
The name gaúcho refers to a person from the region (extreme southern Brazil or the state of Rio Grande do Sul) where this species occurs.
