= Lomanoxoides setosus =

Scientific classification
- Kingdom: Animalia
- Phylum: Arthropoda
- Clade: Pancrustacea
- Class: Insecta
- Order: Coleoptera
- Suborder: Polyphaga
- Infraorder: Scarabaeiformia
- Family: Scarabaeidae
- Genus: Lomanoxoides
- Species: L. setosus

Binomial name
- Lomanoxoides setosus (Balthasar, 1941)

Synonyms
- Odontolytes setosus Balthasar, 1941; Ataenius thoracalis Petrovitz, 1964

Species of beetle

Lomanoxoides setosus is a species of beetle of the family Scarabaeidae. It is found in Argentina, Brazil (Amazonas, Bahia, Distrito Federal, Mato Grosso, Mato Grosso do Sul, Minas Gerais, Paraíba, Paraná, Pernambuco), French Guiana, Guyana and Venezuela.

== Description ==
Adults reach a length of about 3.9–4.1 mm (0.15–0.16 in). The body is reddish brown and the head is punctate, with the punctures coarser and closer on the frons. The clypeus is medially emarginate. The pronotum is not explanate, and has a fringe with evident setae. The posterior margin has two medial tubercles. The elytral interstriae are convex, each with a row of small setaceous tubercles, and each tubercle with a single seta.
