= Euparixoides =

Scientific classification
- Kingdom: Animalia
- Phylum: Arthropoda
- Clade: Pancrustacea
- Class: Insecta
- Order: Coleoptera
- Suborder: Polyphaga
- Infraorder: Scarabaeiformia
- Family: Scarabaeidae
- Subfamily: Aphodiinae
- Tribe: Eupariini
- Genus: Euparixoides; Hinton, 1936

Genus of beetles

Euparixoides is a genus of beetles of the family Scarabaeidae.

== Species ==
- Euparixoides araguaensis Stebnicka & Skelley, 2005
- Euparixoides cribratus Hinton, 1936
- Euparixoides johnsoni Stebnicka, 1998
- Euparixoides papilio Stebnicka & Skelley, 2005
- Euparixoides tachirensis Stebnicka & Skelley, 2005
