= Tanyana =

Scientific classification
- Kingdom: Animalia
- Phylum: Arthropoda
- Clade: Pancrustacea
- Class: Insecta
- Order: Coleoptera
- Suborder: Polyphaga
- Infraorder: Scarabaeiformia
- Family: Scarabaeidae
- Subfamily: Aphodiinae
- Tribe: Eupariini
- Genus: Tanyana; Stebnicka, 2006

Synonyms
- Taenia Stebnicka, 2003

Genus of beetles

Tanyana is a genus of beetles of the family Scarabaeidae.

== Species ==
- Tanyana aniae Minkina, 2022
- Tanyana guyanaensis (Stebnicka, 2003)
