= Euparixoides johnsoni =

Scientific classification
- Kingdom: Animalia
- Phylum: Arthropoda
- Clade: Pancrustacea
- Class: Insecta
- Order: Coleoptera
- Suborder: Polyphaga
- Infraorder: Scarabaeiformia
- Family: Scarabaeidae
- Genus: Euparixoides
- Species: E. johnsoni

Binomial name
- Euparixoides johnsoni Stebnicka, 1998

Species of beetle

Euparixoides johnsoni is a species of beetle of the family Scarabaeidae. It is found in Brazil (Amazonas, Pará, Rondônia) and Peru.

== Description ==
Adults reach a length of about 3.2–3.4 mm (0.13–0.13 in). The clypeus is emarginate, shagreened and finely punctate and the frons is more strongly punctate than the clypeus. The pronotum has the anterior margin explanate and coarsely punctate and the lateral and posterior margins serrate. The posterior margins are also sinuate and the posterior angles are prominent and acuminate. The striae on the elytra are coarsely punctate and wider than the interstriae.
