= Euparixoides araguaensis =

Scientific classification
- Kingdom: Animalia
- Phylum: Arthropoda
- Clade: Pancrustacea
- Class: Insecta
- Order: Coleoptera
- Suborder: Polyphaga
- Infraorder: Scarabaeiformia
- Family: Scarabaeidae
- Genus: Euparixoides
- Species: E. araguaensis

Binomial name
- Euparixoides araguaensis Stebnicka & Skelley, 2005

Species of beetle

Euparixoides araguaensis is a species of beetle of the family Scarabaeidae. It is found in Venezuela.

== Description ==
Adults reach a length of about 3.8 mm (0.15 in). They have an elongate, convex, shiny, very dark brown body, with the legs reddish-brown.

== Etymology ==
The species name refers to the type locality, Aragua.
