= Passaliolla aspericeps =

Scientific classification
- Kingdom: Animalia
- Phylum: Arthropoda
- Clade: Pancrustacea
- Class: Insecta
- Order: Coleoptera
- Suborder: Polyphaga
- Infraorder: Scarabaeiformia
- Family: Scarabaeidae
- Genus: Passaliolla
- Species: P. aspericeps

Binomial name
- Passaliolla aspericeps (Harold, 1876)

Synonyms
- Saprosites aspericeps Harold, 1876; Passaliolla brasiliana Balthasar, 1965

Species of beetle

Passaliolla aspericeps is a species of beetle of the family Scarabaeidae. It is found in Brazil (Amazonas, Minas Gerais, Rio de Janeiro) and Colombia.

== Description ==
Adults reach a length of about 3.8–4 mm (0.15–0.16 in). The head is tuberculate, with the tubercle extending to the frontoclypeal suture. The pronotum has moderate and coarser punctures, with the coarse punctures greatly separated, and the moderate punctures densely distributed.

== Life history ==
Specimens have been recorded at altitudes ranging from 725 to 790 metres in forest litter, as well as in Tapirus and human dung.
