= Flechtmanniella =

Scientific classification
- Kingdom: Animalia
- Phylum: Arthropoda
- Clade: Pancrustacea
- Class: Insecta
- Order: Coleoptera
- Suborder: Polyphaga
- Infraorder: Scarabaeiformia
- Family: Scarabaeidae
- Subfamily: Aphodiinae
- Tribe: Eupariini
- Genus: Flechtmanniella; Stebnicka, 1999
- Species: F. laticollis

Binomial name
- Flechtmanniella laticollis (Petrovitz, 1973)

Synonyms
- Flechtmannia Stebnicka, 1999; Euparia laticollis Petrovitz, 1973

Genus of beetles

Flechtmanniella is a genus of beetle of the family Scarabaeidae. It is monotypic, being represented by the single species, Flechtmanniella laticollis, which is found in Brazil (Bahia, Mato Grosso, Mato Grosso do Sul, Minas Gerais, São Paulo).

== Description ==
Adults reach a length of about 5–6 mm (0.20–0.24 in). The body is robust, glabrous and piceous. The clypeus is strongly gibbous medially. The pronotum is transverse, with the anterior angles explanate and the lateral margins not fringed by setae. The elytra have glabrous and flat interstriae, except for the ninth one, which is carinate and expanded, forming a pseudoepipleuron.

== Life history ==
Specimens have been collected in pastures of Urochloa decumbens and Eucalyptus grandis. Other specimens were also found in nests of Acromyrmex lobicornis.
