= Airapus cechovskyi =

Scientific classification
- Kingdom: Animalia
- Phylum: Arthropoda
- Clade: Pancrustacea
- Class: Insecta
- Order: Coleoptera
- Suborder: Polyphaga
- Infraorder: Scarabaeiformia
- Family: Scarabaeidae
- Genus: Airapus
- Species: A. cechovskyi

Binomial name
- Airapus cechovskyi Král, Mencl & Rakovič, 2019

Species of beetle

Airapus cechovskyi is a species of beetle of the family Scarabaeidae. It is found in Peninsular Malaysia.

== Description ==
Adults reach a length of about 3.4–3.7 mm (0.13–0.15 in). They have an oblong-oval, subparallel, moderately convex and moderately shining, dark blackish-brown body. The anterior margin of the clypeus, anterior pronotal angles and sutural interval of the elytra are brown.

== Etymology ==
The species is named after Petr Čechovský, who provided the authors with the type material.
