= Haroldiataenius saramari =

Scientific classification
- Kingdom: Animalia
- Phylum: Arthropoda
- Clade: Pancrustacea
- Class: Insecta
- Order: Coleoptera
- Suborder: Polyphaga
- Infraorder: Scarabaeiformia
- Family: Scarabaeidae
- Genus: Haroldiataenius
- Species: H. saramari

Binomial name
- Haroldiataenius saramari (Cartwright, 1939)

Synonyms
- Ataenius saramari Cartwright, 1939

Species of beetle

Haroldiataenius saramari is a species of beetle of the family Scarabaeidae. It is found in the United States (Florida)

== Description ==
Adults reach a length of about 3–3.2 mm (0.12–0.13 in). They have a piceous, shining body.

== Life history ==
Specimens have been collected in inland fossil dune systems and are thought to be detritivores.
