= Ataeniopsis notabilis =

Scientific classification
- Kingdom: Animalia
- Phylum: Arthropoda
- Clade: Pancrustacea
- Class: Insecta
- Order: Coleoptera
- Suborder: Polyphaga
- Infraorder: Scarabaeiformia
- Family: Scarabaeidae
- Genus: Ataeniopsis
- Species: A. notabilis

Binomial name
- Ataeniopsis notabilis Petrovitz, 1973

Species of beetle

Ataeniopsis notabilis is a species of beetle of the family Scarabaeidae. It is found in Bolivia and Brazil (Mato Grosso, Piauí).

== Description ==
Adults reach a length of about 3.2–4.8 mm (0.13–0.19 in). The body is reddish testaceous and the head is alutaceous. The clypeus is subtly, but rather widely sinuate. The pronotum is without a posterior marginal line and has punctures of two sizes irregularly spaced. The elytra are twice as long as the pronotum.
