= Ataeniopsis duncani =

Scientific classification
- Kingdom: Animalia
- Phylum: Arthropoda
- Clade: Pancrustacea
- Class: Insecta
- Order: Coleoptera
- Suborder: Polyphaga
- Infraorder: Scarabaeiformia
- Family: Scarabaeidae
- Genus: Ataeniopsis
- Species: A. duncani

Binomial name
- Ataeniopsis duncani (Cartwright, 1974)

Synonyms
- Ataenius duncani Cartwright, 1974

Species of beetle

Ataeniopsis duncani is a species of beetle of the family Scarabaeidae. It is found in the United States (Arizona, California, Colorado, Kansas, New Mexico, Texas) and Mexico (Baja California Sur, Coahuila, Durango, Guanajuato, Sonora).

== Description ==
Adults reach a length of about 3.5–4.1 mm (0.14–0.16 in). They have an elongate, parallel, piceous body, with the legs reddish.

== Life history ==
They have been collected in Acacia grasslands.
