= Euparixia isthmia =

Scientific classification
- Kingdom: Animalia
- Phylum: Arthropoda
- Clade: Pancrustacea
- Class: Insecta
- Order: Coleoptera
- Suborder: Polyphaga
- Infraorder: Scarabaeiformia
- Family: Scarabaeidae
- Genus: Euparixia
- Species: E. isthmia

Binomial name
- Euparixia isthmia Gordon & Mccleve, 2003

Species of beetle

Euparixia isthmia is a species of beetle of the family Scarabaeidae. It is found in Colombia, Panama and Venezuela.

== Description ==
Adults reach a length of about 4.4 mm (0.17 in). They have an elongate, convex, dull, dark brown body.

== Etymology ==
The species name is derived from Latin isthmus (meaning neck or narrow passage) and refers to the Isthmus of Panama.
