= Airapus sicardi =

Scientific classification
- Kingdom: Animalia
- Phylum: Arthropoda
- Clade: Pancrustacea
- Class: Insecta
- Order: Coleoptera
- Suborder: Polyphaga
- Infraorder: Scarabaeiformia
- Family: Scarabaeidae
- Genus: Airapus
- Species: A. sicardi

Binomial name
- Airapus sicardi (Paulian, 1945)

Synonyms
- Euparia sicardi Paulian, 1945

Species of beetle

Airapus sicardi is a species of beetle of the family Scarabaeidae. It is found in Thailand and Vietnam.

== Description ==
Adults reach a length of about 4 mm (0.16 in). They have a dull, dark brown body, which is covered throughout with short, light-colored, erect hairs.
