= Ataeniopsis edistoi =

Scientific classification
- Kingdom: Animalia
- Phylum: Arthropoda
- Clade: Pancrustacea
- Class: Insecta
- Order: Coleoptera
- Suborder: Polyphaga
- Infraorder: Scarabaeiformia
- Family: Scarabaeidae
- Genus: Ataeniopsis
- Species: A. edistoi

Binomial name
- Ataeniopsis edistoi (Cartwright, 1974)

Synonyms
- Ataenius edistoi Cartwright, 1974

Species of beetle

Ataeniopsis edistoi is a species of beetle of the family Scarabaeidae. It is found in the United States (Florida, South Carolina).

== Description ==
Adults reach a length of about 3.9 mm (0.15 in). They have an elongate-oblong, shiny black body, with the anterior margin of the clypeus, anterior margin of the pronotum and the legs reddish.

== Life history ==
They have been collected under surface litter on sandy ground.
