= Euparixia campbelli =

Scientific classification
- Kingdom: Animalia
- Phylum: Arthropoda
- Clade: Pancrustacea
- Class: Insecta
- Order: Coleoptera
- Suborder: Polyphaga
- Infraorder: Scarabaeiformia
- Family: Scarabaeidae
- Genus: Euparixia
- Species: E. campbelli

Binomial name
- Euparixia campbelli Gordon & Mccleve, 2003

Species of beetle

Euparixia campbelli is a species of beetle of the family Scarabaeidae. It is found in Guatemala and Mexico.

== Description ==
Adults reach a length of about 4.1–5.2 mm (0.16–0.20 in). They have an elongate, convex, dull, dark brown body.

== Etymology ==
The species is named for the collector of the type series, J. M. Campbell.
