= Tanyana guyanaensis =

Scientific classification
- Kingdom: Animalia
- Phylum: Arthropoda
- Clade: Pancrustacea
- Class: Insecta
- Order: Coleoptera
- Suborder: Polyphaga
- Infraorder: Scarabaeiformia
- Family: Scarabaeidae
- Genus: Tanyana
- Species: T. guyanaensis

Binomial name
- Tanyana guyanaensis (Stebnicka, 2003)

Synonyms
- Taenia guyanaensis Stebnicka, 2003

Species of beetle

Tanyana guyanaensis is a species of beetle of the family Scarabaeidae. It is found in Brazil (Acre, Mato Grosso), Colombia, French Guiana, Guyana and Suriname.

== Description ==
Adults reach a length of about 2–2.1 mm (0.079–0.083 in). The head has coarse punctures and the clypeus is clearly sinuate. The pronotum has fine and coarse punctures. The elytral striae are coarsely punctate and the abdominal ventrites are strigate.

== Life history ==
Specimens were collected at altitudes ranging from 30 to 480 metres.
