= Airapus halmaheraensis =

Scientific classification
- Kingdom: Animalia
- Phylum: Arthropoda
- Clade: Pancrustacea
- Class: Insecta
- Order: Coleoptera
- Suborder: Polyphaga
- Infraorder: Scarabaeiformia
- Family: Scarabaeidae
- Genus: Airapus
- Species: A. halmaheraensis

Binomial name
- Airapus halmaheraensis Minkina & Bellmann, 2023

Species of beetle

Airapus halmaheraensis is a species of beetle of the family Scarabaeidae. It is found in Indonesia (Halmahera).

== Description ==
Adults reach a length of about 3.9–4 mm (0.15–0.16 in). They have an oblong-oval, relatively wide, convex, mat, dark brownish body with orange-brownish legs and with the tibiae, tarsi and antennae yellowish.

== Etymology ==
The species is named after Halmahera, the island on which the type specimens were collected.
