= Cnematoplatys sumatrana =

Scientific classification
- Kingdom: Animalia
- Phylum: Arthropoda
- Clade: Pancrustacea
- Class: Insecta
- Order: Coleoptera
- Suborder: Polyphaga
- Infraorder: Scarabaeiformia
- Family: Scarabaeidae
- Genus: Cnematoplatys
- Species: C. sumatrana

Binomial name
- Cnematoplatys sumatrana Balthasar, 1967

Species of beetle

Cnematoplatys sumatrana is a species of beetle of the family Scarabaeidae. It is found in Indonesia (Sumatra).

== Description ==
Adults reach a length of about 3.4–3.6 mm (0.13–0.14 in). They have an elongate, parallel-sided, weakly shining, castaneous body. The upper surface is covered with tiny pubescence.
