= Passaliolla cancellata =

Scientific classification
- Kingdom: Animalia
- Phylum: Arthropoda
- Clade: Pancrustacea
- Class: Insecta
- Order: Coleoptera
- Suborder: Polyphaga
- Infraorder: Scarabaeiformia
- Family: Scarabaeidae
- Genus: Passaliolla
- Species: P. cancellata

Binomial name
- Passaliolla cancellata (Bates, 1887)

Synonyms
- Saprosites cancellatus Bates, 1887; Passaliolla depressa Balthasar, 1945

Species of beetle

Passaliolla cancellata is a species of beetle of the family Scarabaeidae. It is found in Bolivia, Brazil (Amazonas, Mato Grosso, Rondônia), Colombia and Ecuador.

== Description ==
Adults reach a length of about 2.8–3 mm (0.11–0.12 in). The head is punctate, and anteriorly tuberculate, with the tubercles not extending beyond the anterior gibbosity. The pronotum has punctures of two sizes, coarse and moderate. Both are densely distributed across the pronotum. The elytra have deep striae, and are coarsely and closely punctate.

== Life history ==
Specimens were collected inside rotten logs and forest litter.
