= Batesiana chamorroi =

Scientific classification
- Kingdom: Animalia
- Phylum: Arthropoda
- Clade: Pancrustacea
- Class: Insecta
- Order: Coleoptera
- Suborder: Polyphaga
- Infraorder: Scarabaeiformia
- Family: Scarabaeidae
- Genus: Batesiana
- Species: B. chamorroi

Binomial name
- Batesiana chamorroi Skelley & Vaz-de-Mello, 2022

Species of beetle

Batesiana chamorroi is a species of beetle of the family Scarabaeidae. It is found in Brazil (Roraima) and Ecuador.

== Description ==
Adults reach a length of about 7.5 mm (0.30 in). The head has coarse and wide punctures and the clypeus is anteriorly bent at an angle of nearly 90° degrees before the median gibbosity. The pronotum is coarsely and densely punctate, with a large lateral fovea. The lateral margin is explanate, with the posterior angles strongly projected. The elytra are tuberculate.
