= Cnematoplatys benardi =

Scientific classification
- Kingdom: Animalia
- Phylum: Arthropoda
- Clade: Pancrustacea
- Class: Insecta
- Order: Coleoptera
- Suborder: Polyphaga
- Infraorder: Scarabaeiformia
- Family: Scarabaeidae
- Genus: Cnematoplatys
- Species: C. benardi

Binomial name
- Cnematoplatys benardi Schmidt, 1914

Species of beetle

Cnematoplatys benardi is a species of beetle of the family Scarabaeidae. It is found in Indonesia (Sumatra).

== Description ==
Adults reach a length of about 4–4.5 mm (0.16–0.18 in). They have an elongate-oval, glabrous, shining, dark castenous to piceous body.
