= Ataeniopsis figurator =

Scientific classification
- Kingdom: Animalia
- Phylum: Arthropoda
- Clade: Pancrustacea
- Class: Insecta
- Order: Coleoptera
- Suborder: Polyphaga
- Infraorder: Scarabaeiformia
- Family: Scarabaeidae
- Genus: Ataeniopsis
- Species: A. figurator

Binomial name
- Ataeniopsis figurator (Harold, 1874)

Synonyms
- Ataenius figurator Harold, 1874

Species of beetle

Ataeniopsis figurator is a species of aphodiine dung beetle in the family Scarabaeidae. It is found in North America, where it has been recorded from Florida, Kansas, Louisiana, Maryland, New Jersey, New Mexico and South Carolina.

== Description ==
Adults reach a length of about 3.3–4.2 mm (0.13–0.17 in). They have a strongly shiny, black, not quite parallel body.
