= Setylaides canescens =

Scientific classification
- Kingdom: Animalia
- Phylum: Arthropoda
- Clade: Pancrustacea
- Class: Insecta
- Order: Coleoptera
- Suborder: Polyphaga
- Infraorder: Scarabaeiformia
- Family: Scarabaeidae
- Genus: Setylaides
- Species: S. canescens

Binomial name
- Setylaides canescens (Balthasar, 1933)

Synonyms
- Dialytes canescens Balthasar, 1933

Species of beetle

Setylaides canescens is a species of beetle of the family Scarabaeidae. It is found in Vietnam.

== Description ==
Adults reach a length of about 3.5–4 mm (0.14–0.16 in). They have an oblong-oval, strongly convex, black body. The forebody is glossy, while the elytra are dull, with a greyish-blue, faintly iridescent coating.
