= Euparixia duncani =

Scientific classification
- Kingdom: Animalia
- Phylum: Arthropoda
- Clade: Pancrustacea
- Class: Insecta
- Order: Coleoptera
- Suborder: Polyphaga
- Infraorder: Scarabaeiformia
- Family: Scarabaeidae
- Genus: Euparixia
- Species: E. duncani

Binomial name
- Euparixia duncani Brown, 1927

Species of beetle

Euparixia duncani is a species of aphodiine dung beetle in the family Scarabaeidae. It is found in the United States (Arizona) and Mexico (Jalisco, Morelos, Nayarit, Sinaloa).

== Description ==
Adults reach a length of about 5–5.75 mm (0.197–0.226 in). They have an elongate, convex, feebly shining (often encrusted with light-colored dirt), reddish brown body, which is darker at the clypeal and posterior pronotal margin. The legs and ventral surface are similarly colored but slightly darker than the dorsum.
