= Aphotaenius =

Scientific classification
- Kingdom: Animalia
- Phylum: Arthropoda
- Clade: Pancrustacea
- Class: Insecta
- Order: Coleoptera
- Suborder: Polyphaga
- Infraorder: Scarabaeiformia
- Family: Scarabaeidae
- Tribe: Eupariini
- Genus: Aphotaenius; Cartwright, 1952

Genus of beetles

Aphotaenius is a genus of aphodiine dung beetles in the family Scarabaeidae. There are about five described species in Aphotaenius.

== Species ==
These species belong to the genus Aphotaenius:

- Aphotaenius cambeforti Chalumeau, 1983
- Aphotaenius carolinus (Van Dyke, 1928)
- Aphotaenius convexus (Harold, 1880)
- Aphotaenius elegans Skelley & Vaz-de-Mello, 2020
- Aphotaenius gaucho Skelley & Vaz-de-Mello, 2020
- Aphotaenius hamelae Skelley & Vaz-de-Mello, 2020
- Aphotaenius howdeni Cartwright, 1963
- Aphotaenius plaumanni Cartwright, 1963
