= Lomanoxoides mapitunari =

Scientific classification
- Kingdom: Animalia
- Phylum: Arthropoda
- Clade: Pancrustacea
- Class: Insecta
- Order: Coleoptera
- Suborder: Polyphaga
- Infraorder: Scarabaeiformia
- Family: Scarabaeidae
- Genus: Lomanoxoides
- Species: L. mapitunari

Binomial name
- Lomanoxoides mapitunari Stebnicka & Skelley, 2005

Species of beetle

Lomanoxoides mapitunari is a species of beetle of the family Scarabaeidae. It is found in Peru.

== Description ==
Adults reach a length of about 5–5.5 mm (0.20–0.22 in). They have an elongate-oval, convex, microreticulate and moderately shiny, piceous body, in some specimens with the elytra brownish.

== Etymology ==
The species name refers to the type locality, Rio Mapitunari in the Cuzco Department.
