= Paraplesiataenius genieri =

Scientific classification
- Kingdom: Animalia
- Phylum: Arthropoda
- Clade: Pancrustacea
- Class: Insecta
- Order: Coleoptera
- Suborder: Polyphaga
- Infraorder: Scarabaeiformia
- Family: Scarabaeidae
- Genus: Paraplesiataenius
- Species: P. genieri

Binomial name
- Paraplesiataenius genieri Stebnicka, 2003

Species of beetle

Paraplesiataenius genieri is a species of beetle of the family Scarabaeidae. It is found in Brazil (Bahia, Mato Grosso, Minas Gerais, Paraná, Santa Catarina).

== Description ==
Adults reach a length of about 4.5–5.1 mm (0.18–0.20 in). The body is reddish brown, opaque and shagreened. The clypeus is more finely punctate than the frons. The pronotum is swollen laterally and coarsely punctate. The interstriae on the elytra have a row of large setae along the outer margin, and the interstriae are glabrous medially.

== Life history ==
Specimens have been extracted from Acromyrmex subterraneus nests.
