= Aphotaenius elegans =

Scientific classification
- Kingdom: Animalia
- Phylum: Arthropoda
- Clade: Pancrustacea
- Class: Insecta
- Order: Coleoptera
- Suborder: Polyphaga
- Infraorder: Scarabaeiformia
- Family: Scarabaeidae
- Genus: Aphotaenius
- Species: A. elegans

Binomial name
- Aphotaenius elegans Skelley & Vaz-de-Mello, 2020

Species of beetle

Aphotaenius elegans is a species of beetle of the family Scarabaeidae. It is found in Bolivia and Brazil (Maranhão, Minas Gerais).

== Description ==
Adults reach a length of about 1.6–2.7 mm (0.063–0.106 in). The clypeus is emarginate, with the angles lateral to the emargination denticulate. The punctures of the frons are larger than those of the clypeus. The pronotum has punctures of two sizes, uniformly distributed across its surface. The elytral interstriae have two marginal rows of small punctures.

== Life history ==
Specimens have been collected in feces of Mazama species.

== Etymology ==
The species name refers to the elegant sculpturing of the elytra and clypeal teeth.
