= Haroldiataenius =

Scientific classification
- Kingdom: Animalia
- Phylum: Arthropoda
- Clade: Pancrustacea
- Class: Insecta
- Order: Coleoptera
- Suborder: Polyphaga
- Infraorder: Scarabaeiformia
- Family: Scarabaeidae
- Tribe: Eupariini
- Genus: Haroldiataenius; Chalumeau, 1981

Synonyms
- Haroldiataenius (Sayloria) Chalumeau, 1981

Genus of beetles

Haroldiataenius is a genus of aphodiine dung beetles in the family Scarabaeidae. There are about nine described species in Haroldiataenius.

== Species ==
These nine species belong to the genus Haroldiataenius:

- Haroldiataenius buvexus Stebnicka & Skelley, 2009
- Haroldiataenius convexus (Robinson, 1940)
- Haroldiataenius griffini (Cartwright, 1974)
- Haroldiataenius hintoni (Saylor, 1933)
- Haroldiataenius limbatus (Bates, 1887)
- Haroldiataenius lucanus (Horn, 1871)
- Haroldiataenius mariarum (Bates, 1887)
- Haroldiataenius saramari (Cartwright, 1939)
- Haroldiataenius semipilosus (Van Dyke, 1928)
