= Airapus =

Scientific classification
- Kingdom: Animalia
- Phylum: Arthropoda
- Clade: Pancrustacea
- Class: Insecta
- Order: Coleoptera
- Suborder: Polyphaga
- Infraorder: Scarabaeiformia
- Family: Scarabaeidae
- Subfamily: Aphodiinae
- Tribe: Eupariini
- Genus: Airapus; Stebnicka & Howden, 1996

Genus of beetles

Airapus is a genus of beetles of the family Scarabaeidae.

== Species ==
- Airapus aegialiformis Minkina, 2020
- Airapus bruxnerensis Stebnicka & Howden, 1996
- Airapus burrundieae Stebnicka & Howden, 1996
- Airapus cechovskyi Král, Mencl & Rakovič, 2019
- Airapus cheesmani (Paulian, 1939)
- Airapus gazelle Stebnicka, 1998
- Airapus granulator (Harold, 1877)
- Airapus halmaheraensis Minkina & Bellmann, 2023
- Airapus henriettae Stebnicka & Howden, 1996
- Airapus hollandiae Stebnicka, 1998
- Airapus idenburgii (Paulian, 1937)
- Airapus interstitialis (Fairmaire, 1883)
- Airapus jenisi Král, Mencl & Rakovič, 2019
- Airapus lamingtonensis Minkina & Bellmann, 2023
- Airapus madangensis Minkina, 2023
- Airapus malaitaensis Minkina & Jákl, 2024
- Airapus nondugli Stebnicka, 1998
- Airapus novaebritanniae (Balthasar, 1961)
- Airapus novaeirlandiae (Balthasar, 1967)
- Airapus obscurus (MacLeay, 1871)
- Airapus parvispinus (Schmidt, 1920)
- Airapus popondettae Stebnicka, 1998
- Airapus pygidialis (Lea, 1923)
- Airapus rakovici Král & Lu, 2021
- Airapus rudolphi Bellmann & Minkina, 2023
- Airapus rugulopunctatus (Krikken, 1970)
- Airapus sicardi (Paulian, 1945)
- Airapus spinator (Harold, 1877)
- Airapus sulawesianus Rakovič, Mencl & Král, 2021
- Airapus sumatrae (Fairmaire, 1896)
- Airapus tyri Král, Mencl & Rakovič, 2019
- Airapus uniseriatus (Krikken, 1970)
- Airapus vangviengensis Minkina & Bellmann, 2023
- Airapus wallaceanus Rakovič, Mencl & Král, 2019
- Airapus wampuensis Stebnicka, 1998
- Airapus wauus Stebnicka, 1998
- Airapus yunnanensis Bellmann & Minkina, 2023
- †Airapus lithuanicus Tamutis, Alekseev & Bukejs, 2017
