= Euparixia moseri =

Scientific classification
- Kingdom: Animalia
- Phylum: Arthropoda
- Clade: Pancrustacea
- Class: Insecta
- Order: Coleoptera
- Suborder: Polyphaga
- Infraorder: Scarabaeiformia
- Family: Scarabaeidae
- Genus: Euparixia
- Species: E. moseri

Binomial name
- Euparixia moseri Woodruff & Cartwright, 1967

Species of beetle

Euparixia moseri is a species of aphodiine dung beetle in the family Scarabaeidae. It is found in the United States (Louisiana).

== Description ==
Adults reach a length of about 4.8 mm (0.19 in). They have an elongate, convex, feebly shining, reddish brown body, with the basal margin of the pronotum and legs darker.

== Life history ==
Specimens have been collected from nests of Atta texana.
