= Napoa =

Scientific classification
- Kingdom: Animalia
- Phylum: Arthropoda
- Clade: Pancrustacea
- Class: Insecta
- Order: Coleoptera
- Suborder: Polyphaga
- Infraorder: Scarabaeiformia
- Family: Scarabaeidae
- Subfamily: Aphodiinae
- Tribe: Eupariini
- Genus: Napoa; Stebnicka, 1999
- Species: N. peckorum

Binomial name
- Napoa peckorum Stebnicka, 1999

Genus of beetles

Napoa is a genus of beetle of the family Scarabaeidae. It is monotypic, being represented by the single species, Napoa peckorum, which is found in Ecuador.

== Description ==
Adults reach a length of about 5–5.2 mm (0.20–0.20 in). They have a carbon black, shining body, with the sides of the pronotum and the lateral and apical areas of the elytra with scarce setae.

== Etymology ==
The name of the genus refers to the type locality of the type species and the species is named in honour of Jarmila and Steward Peck.
