= Aphotaenius hamelae =

Scientific classification
- Kingdom: Animalia
- Phylum: Arthropoda
- Clade: Pancrustacea
- Class: Insecta
- Order: Coleoptera
- Suborder: Polyphaga
- Infraorder: Scarabaeiformia
- Family: Scarabaeidae
- Genus: Aphotaenius
- Species: A. hamelae

Binomial name
- Aphotaenius hamelae Skelley & Vaz-de-Mello, 2020

Species of beetle

Aphotaenius hamelae is a species of beetle of the family Scarabaeidae. It is found in Bolivia.

== Description ==
Adults reach a length of about 2.4–2.5 mm (0.094–0.098 in). They have an elongate, glossy, piceous black body.

== Life history ==
They have been collected from cow dung.

== Etymology ==
The species is named for the Bolivian scarab researcher Caroli Hamel.
