= Lomanoxoides tesari =

Scientific classification
- Kingdom: Animalia
- Phylum: Arthropoda
- Clade: Pancrustacea
- Class: Insecta
- Order: Coleoptera
- Suborder: Polyphaga
- Infraorder: Scarabaeiformia
- Family: Scarabaeidae
- Genus: Lomanoxoides
- Species: L. tesari

Binomial name
- Lomanoxoides tesari (Balthasar, 1963)

Synonyms
- Euparia tesari Balthasar, 1963; Ataenius hrubantovai Chalumeau, 1992; Ataenius fastigatus Petrovitz, 1973

Species of beetle

Lomanoxoides tesari is a species of beetle of the family Scarabaeidae. It is found in Argentina, Brazil (Distrito Federal, Mato Grosso, Mato Grosso do Sul, Minas Gerais, Rio de Janeiro, Rondônia, São Paulo) and Paraguay.

== Description ==
Adults reach a length of about 4.8–5.5 mm (0.19–0.22 in). The body is reddish brown and the head is punctate, with the punctures coarser and closer on the frons. The pronotum is not explanate, but somewhat regularly convex. The margin of the elytra is setaceous posteriorly and laterally and the interstriae are convex and tectiform with two rows of fine punctures.

== Life history ==
Specimens have been found within the nests of Atta sexdens and in bovine feces.
