= Ataeniopsis armasi =

Scientific classification
- Kingdom: Animalia
- Phylum: Arthropoda
- Clade: Pancrustacea
- Class: Insecta
- Order: Coleoptera
- Suborder: Polyphaga
- Infraorder: Scarabaeiformia
- Family: Scarabaeidae
- Genus: Ataeniopsis
- Species: A. armasi

Binomial name
- Ataeniopsis armasi (Chalumeau, 1982)

Synonyms
- Ataenius armasi Chalumeau, 1982

Species of beetle

Ataeniopsis armasi is a species of beetle of the family Scarabaeidae. It is found in Guadeloupe, Haiti, Hispaniola and Puerto Rico.

== Description ==
Adults reach a length of about 3.3–3.8 mm (0.13–0.15 in). They have a reddish black to black body, with the legs somewhat lighter.
