= Iguazua blackwelderi =

Scientific classification
- Kingdom: Animalia
- Phylum: Arthropoda
- Clade: Pancrustacea
- Class: Insecta
- Order: Coleoptera
- Suborder: Polyphaga
- Infraorder: Scarabaeiformia
- Family: Scarabaeidae
- Genus: Iguazua
- Species: I. blackwelderi

Binomial name
- Iguazua blackwelderi (Chapin, 1940)

Synonyms
- Saprosites blackwelderi Chapin, 1940

Species of beetle

Iguazua blackwelderi is a species of beetle of the family Scarabaeidae. It is found in Guadeloupe, Saint Lucia, Monserrat, Cuba, French Guiana, Guyana, Puerto Rico and Suriname.

== Description ==
Adults reach a length of about 2.8–3.1 mm (0.11–0.12 in). They have a parallel-sided, glabrous, moderately shiny, light castaneous body.
