= Euparixoides papilio =

Scientific classification
- Kingdom: Animalia
- Phylum: Arthropoda
- Clade: Pancrustacea
- Class: Insecta
- Order: Coleoptera
- Suborder: Polyphaga
- Infraorder: Scarabaeiformia
- Family: Scarabaeidae
- Genus: Euparixoides
- Species: E. papilio

Binomial name
- Euparixoides papilio Stebnicka & Skelley, 2005

Species of beetle

Euparixoides papilio is a species of beetle of the family Scarabaeidae. It is found in Costa Rica.

== Description ==
Adults reach a length of about 3.9 mm (0.15 in). They have an elongate, convex, moderately shiny, piceous to black body, with the margins of the clypeus, sides of the pronotum and legs reddish-brown.

== Etymology ==
The species name is derived from papilionaceous (meaning butterfly-shaped or winged) and refers to the shape of the pronotum.
