= Setylaides =

Scientific classification
- Kingdom: Animalia
- Phylum: Arthropoda
- Clade: Pancrustacea
- Class: Insecta
- Order: Coleoptera
- Suborder: Polyphaga
- Infraorder: Scarabaeiformia
- Family: Scarabaeidae
- Subfamily: Aphodiinae
- Tribe: Eupariini
- Genus: Setylaides; Stebnicka, 1994

Genus of beetles

Setylaides is a genus of beetles of the family Scarabaeidae.

== Species ==
- Setylaides assamensis Maté, 2016
- Setylaides canescens (Balthasar, 1933)
- Setylaides chiangmai Stebnicka, 2008
- Setylaides foveatus (Schmidt, 1909)
- Setylaides monstrosus (Harold, 1877)
- Setylaides nakanoi Ochi & Kawahara, 2019
- Setylaides palawanensis Ochi, Kon & Cabras, 2025
- Setylaides punctatus (Schmidt, 1911)
- Setylaides tsujii Kakizoe, Kawahara & Ochi, 2021
