= Haroldiataenius convexus =

Scientific classification
- Kingdom: Animalia
- Phylum: Arthropoda
- Clade: Pancrustacea
- Class: Insecta
- Order: Coleoptera
- Suborder: Polyphaga
- Infraorder: Scarabaeiformia
- Family: Scarabaeidae
- Genus: Haroldiataenius
- Species: H. convexus

Binomial name
- Haroldiataenius convexus (Robinson, 1940)

Synonyms
- Ataenius convexus Robinson, 1940

Species of beetle

Haroldiataenius convexus is a species of aphodiine dung beetle in the family Scarabaeidae. It is found in the United States (Texas).

== Description ==
Adults reach a length of about 3.2–4.2 mm (0.13–0.17 in). They have a dark reddish brown, shining body.

== Life history ==
Specimens have been collected in animal burrows and plant litter.
