= Setylaides foveatus =

Scientific classification
- Kingdom: Animalia
- Phylum: Arthropoda
- Clade: Pancrustacea
- Class: Insecta
- Order: Coleoptera
- Suborder: Polyphaga
- Infraorder: Scarabaeiformia
- Family: Scarabaeidae
- Genus: Setylaides
- Species: S. foveatus

Binomial name
- Setylaides foveatus (Schmidt, 1909)

Synonyms
- Dialytes foveatus Schmidt, 1909

Species of beetle

Setylaides foveatus is a species of beetle of the family Scarabaeidae. It is found in Taiwan and Japan (Ryukyu Archipelago).

== Description ==
Adults reach a length of about 4 mm (0.16 in). They have an elongate, nearly parallel-sided, black body, with the elytra sometimes duller than the forebody.
