= Passaliolla corticalis =

Scientific classification
- Kingdom: Animalia
- Phylum: Arthropoda
- Clade: Pancrustacea
- Class: Insecta
- Order: Coleoptera
- Suborder: Polyphaga
- Infraorder: Scarabaeiformia
- Family: Scarabaeidae
- Genus: Passaliolla
- Species: P. corticalis

Binomial name
- Passaliolla corticalis (Bates, 1887)

Synonyms
- Saprosites corticalis Bates, 1887; Passaliolla imitatrix Balthasar, 1965

Species of beetle

Passaliolla corticalis is a species of beetle of the family Scarabaeidae. It is found in Bolivia, Brazil (Amazonas, Espírito Santo, Mato Grosso), Colombia, Ecuador, French Guiana, Peru, Suriname and Venezuela.

== Description ==
Adults reach a length of about 3.1–3.9 mm (0.12–0.15 in). The clypeus is entirely granulate and the frontoclypeal suture is indistinct. The pronotum has fine and moderate punctures and small foveae laterally.

== Life history ==
Specimens have been collected in forest litter and inside logs at altitudes ranging from 725 to 1000 metres.
