= Annegialia =

Scientific classification
- Kingdom: Animalia
- Phylum: Arthropoda
- Clade: Pancrustacea
- Class: Insecta
- Order: Coleoptera
- Suborder: Polyphaga
- Infraorder: Scarabaeiformia
- Family: Scarabaeidae
- Genus: Annegialia; Howden, 1971
- Species: A. ataeniformis

Binomial name
- Annegialia ataeniformis Howden, 1971

Genus of beetles

Annegialia is a genus of aphodiine dung beetles in the family Scarabaeidae containing one described species, A. ataeniformis. It is found in the United States (Utah).
