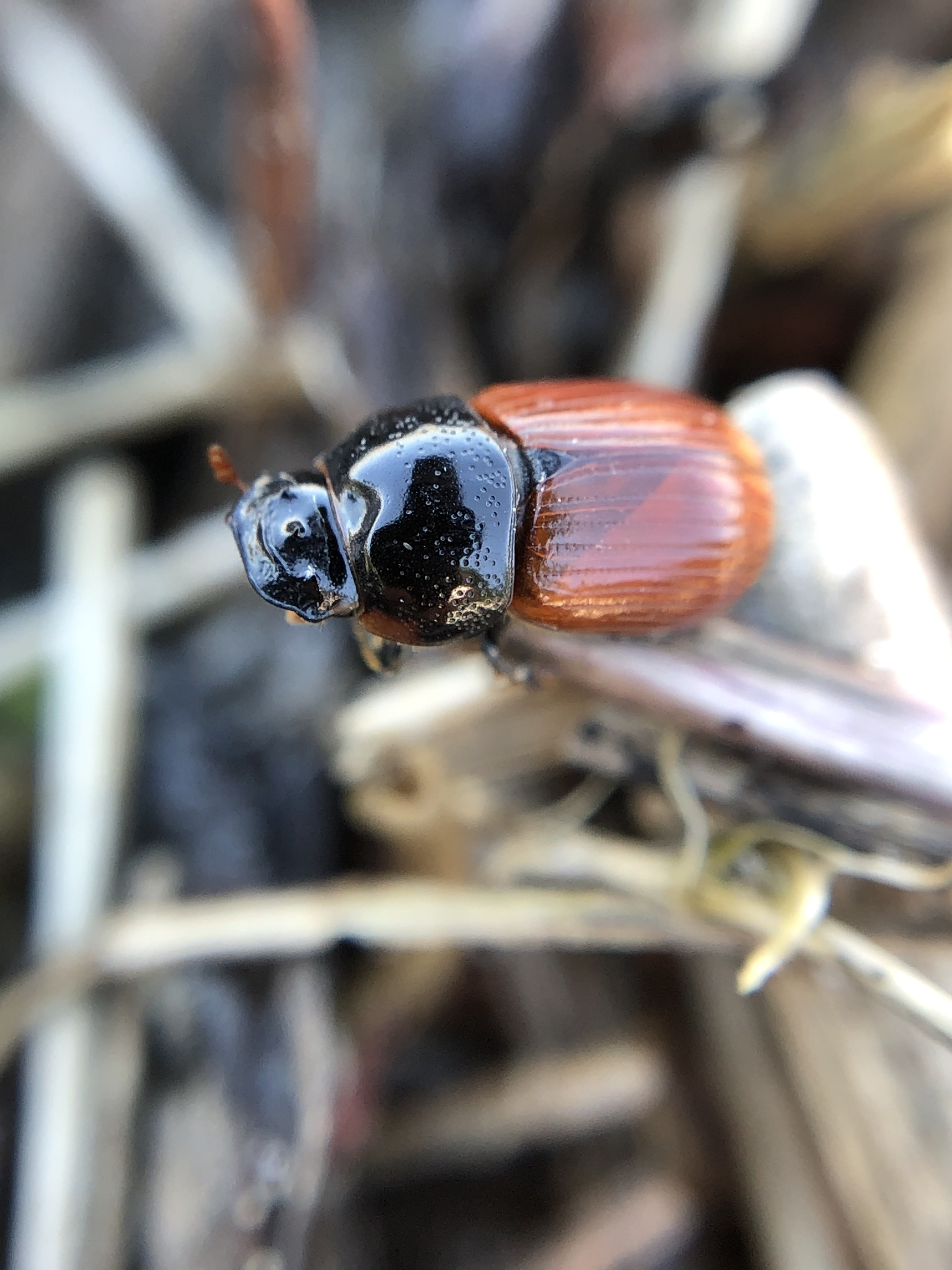
- Aphodius pedellus, Canada

Scientific classification
- Kingdom: Animalia
- Phylum: Arthropoda
- Clade: Pancrustacea
- Class: Insecta
- Order: Coleoptera
- Suborder: Polyphaga
- Infraorder: Scarabaeiformia
- Family: Scarabaeidae
- Subfamily: Aphodiinae
- Tribe: Aphodiini
- Genus: Aphodius; Illiger, 1798

Synonyms
- Aphodius (Cytoderhinus) Seabra, 1909; Platycephalus Cuvier, 1798

= Aphodius =

Genus of beetles

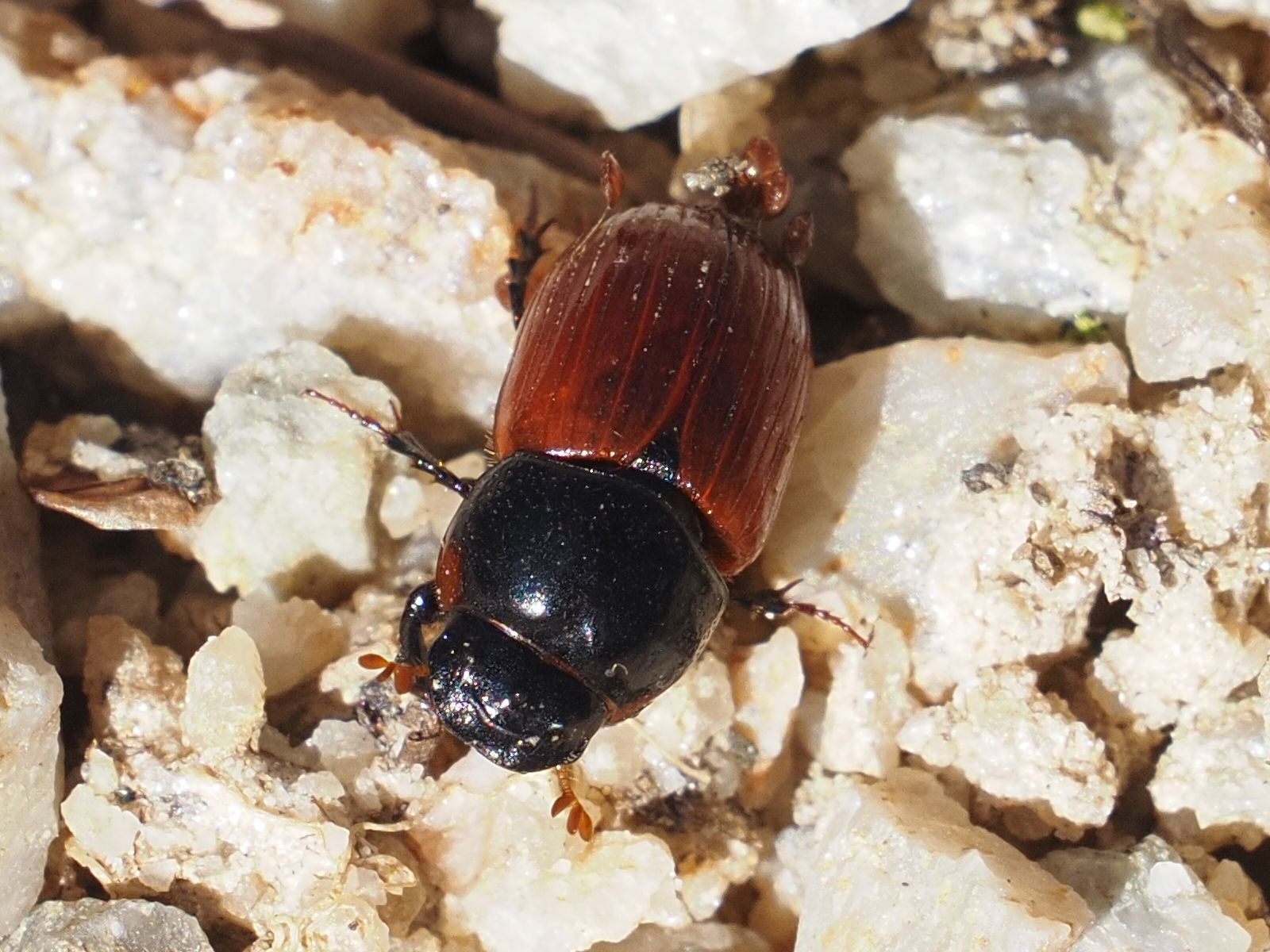
Aphodius fimetarius, Austria

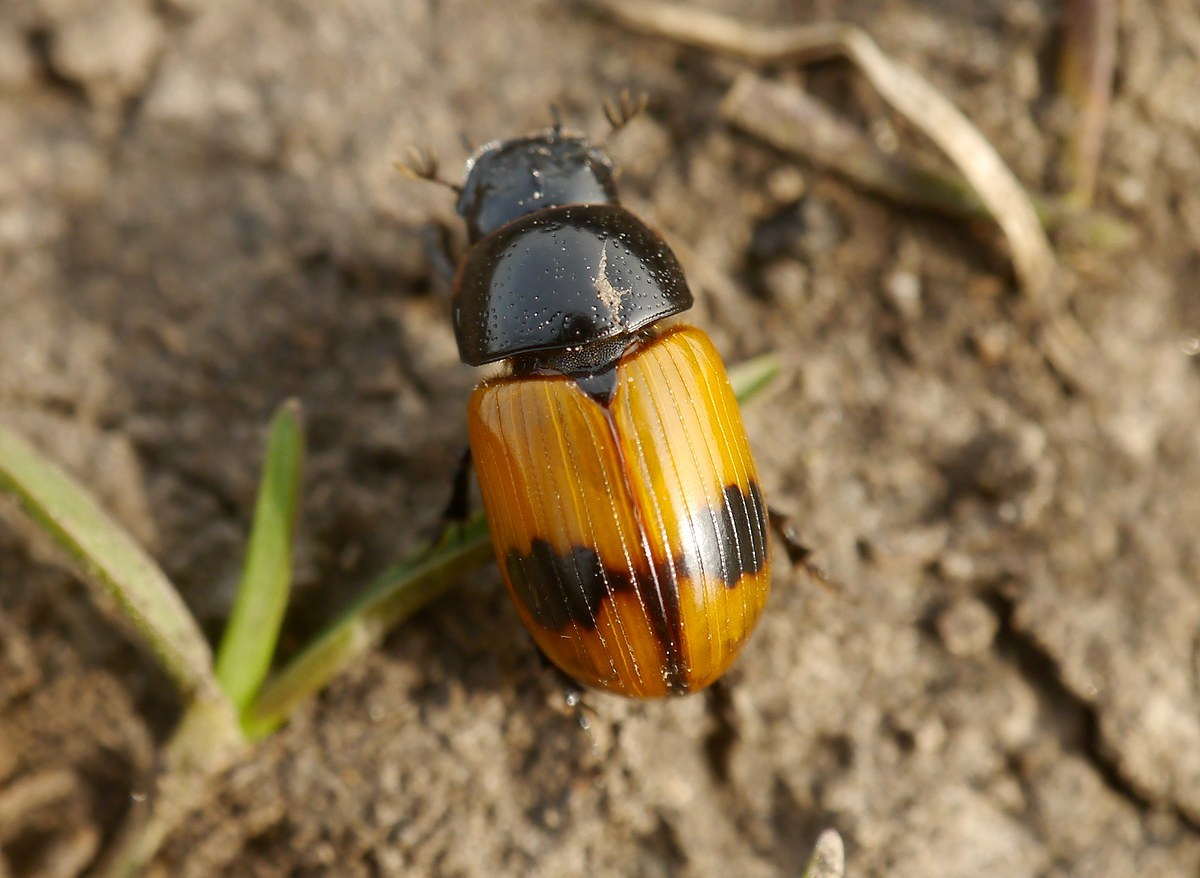
Aphodius coniugatus, Ukraine

Aphodius is a genus of beetles in the family Scarabaeidae. In most species both the adults and larvae are coprophagous (dung feeding) although some species have herbivorous or saprophagous larvae. Aphodius species typically dominate dung beetle communities in north temperate ecosystems. Most species are functionally classified as endocoprids, also known as dwellers, because the larvae live and feed within the dung pat itself.

With a discovery of an earlier published version by Hellwig, the correct citation for this genus is now: Aphodius Hellwig, 1798 (p. 101; 24 January). Type species by subsequent designation by Latreille (1810): Scarabaeus fimetarius Linnaeus, 1758.

== Species ==
These 44 species belong to the genus Aphodius, including 21 extinct species.

- Aphodius beloni Mulsant & Godart, 1879
- Aphodius calichromus Balthasar, 1932
- Aphodius cardinalis Reitter, 1892
- Aphodius clypeatus Fischer von Waldheim, 1821
- Aphodius coniugatus (Panzer, 1795)
- Aphodius corallifer Koshantschikov, 1913
- Aphodius crux Wiedemann, 1823
- Aphodius elegans Allibert, 1847
- Aphodius fasciger Harold, 1881
- Aphodius fimetarius (Linnaeus, 1758)
- Aphodius foetidus (Herbst, 1783)
- Aphodius guangdongensis Maté, 2008
- Aphodius irregularis Westwood, 1839
- Aphodius marginatus Fischer von Waldheim, 1842
- Aphodius micros Walker, 1871
- Aphodius minatorius Péringuey, 1908
- Aphodius pedellus (Degeer, 1774)
- Aphodius pedrosi Wollaston, 1854
- Aphodius plasoni Käufel, 1914
- Aphodius reginae Král, 1997
- Aphodius spadix Schmidt, 1916
- Aphodius swaneticus Reitter, 1892
- Aphodius thoracicus Fischer von Waldheim, 1842
- † Aphodius aboriginalis Wickham, 1912
- † Aphodius anteactus Krell, 2000
- † Aphodius bosniaskii Handlirsch, 1907
- † Aphodius brevipennis Heer, 1862
- † Aphodius charauxi Piton, 1940
- † Aphodius cretaceous Nikolajev, 2008
- † Aphodius florissantensis Wickham, 1911
- † Aphodius granarioides Wickham, 1913
- † Aphodius helvolus Statz, 1952
- † Aphodius inundatus Wickham, 1914
- † Aphodius krantzi Heyden & Heyden, 1866
- † Aphodius laminicola Wickham, 1910
- † Aphodius mediaevus Wickham, 1914
- † Aphodius meyeri Heer, 1847
- † Aphodius praeemptor Wickham, 1913
- † Aphodius precursor Horn, 1876
- † Aphodius schlickumi Statz, 1952
- † Aphodius senex Wickham, 1914
- † Aphodius shoshonis Wickham, 1912
- † Aphodius theobaldi Krell, 2000
- † Aphodius vectis Krell, 2019

The species of the following genera were formerly classified in Aphodius:

Acrossus Mulsant, 1842
Agoliinus Schmidt, 1913
Alloblackburneus Bordat, 2009
Ballucus Gordon & Skelley, 2007
Blackburneus Schmidt, 1913
Calamosternus Motschulsky, 1859
Caligodorus Gordon & Skelley, 2007
Cephalocyclus Dellacasa et al., 1998
Chilothorax Motschulsky, 1859
Cinacanthus Schmidt, 1913
Coelotrachelus Schmidt, 1913
Colobopterus Mulsant, 1842
Cryptoscatomaseter Gordon & Skelley, 2007
Dellacasiellus Gordon & Skelley, 2007
Dialytodius Gordon & Skelley, 2007
Drepanocanthoides Schmidt, 1913
Eupleurus Mulsant, 1842
Flaviellus Gordon & Skelley, 2007
Geomyphilus Gordon & Skelley, 2007
Haroldiellus Gordon & Skelley, 2007
Hornosus Dellacasa, Dellacasa & Gordon, 2015
Irrasinus Gordon & Skelley, 2007
Labarrus Mulsant & Rey, 1869
Lechorodius Gordon & Skelley, 2007
Liothorax Motschulsky, 1859
Luxolinus Gordon & Skelley, 2007
Maculaphodius Gordon & Skelley, 2007
Melinopterus Mulsant, 1842
Mendidius Harold, 1868
Merogyrus Gordon & Skelley, 2007
Neotrichonotulus Dellacasa et al., 2004
Nialaphodius Kolbe, 1908
Orodaliscoides Schmidt, 1913
Oscarinus Gordon & Skelley, 2007
Otophorus Mulsant, 1842
Oxyomoides Dellacasa et al., 2016
Pardalosus Gordon & Skelley, 2007
Phaeaphodius Reitter, 1892
Planolinellus Dellacasa & Dellacasa, 2005
Planolinoides Dellacasa & Dellacasa, 2005
Planolinus Mulsant & Rey, 1869
Pseudagolius Schmidt, 1913
Rugaphodius Gordon & Skelley, 2007
Scabrostomus Gordon & Skelley, 2007
Schaefferellus Gordon & Skelley, 2007
Setodius Gordon & Skelley, 2007
Stenotothorax Schmidt, 1913
Strigodius Gordon & Skelley, 2007
Tetraclipeoides Schmidt, 1913
Teuchestes Mulsant, 1842
Trichaphodioides Paulian, 1942
Trichonotulus Bedel, 1911
