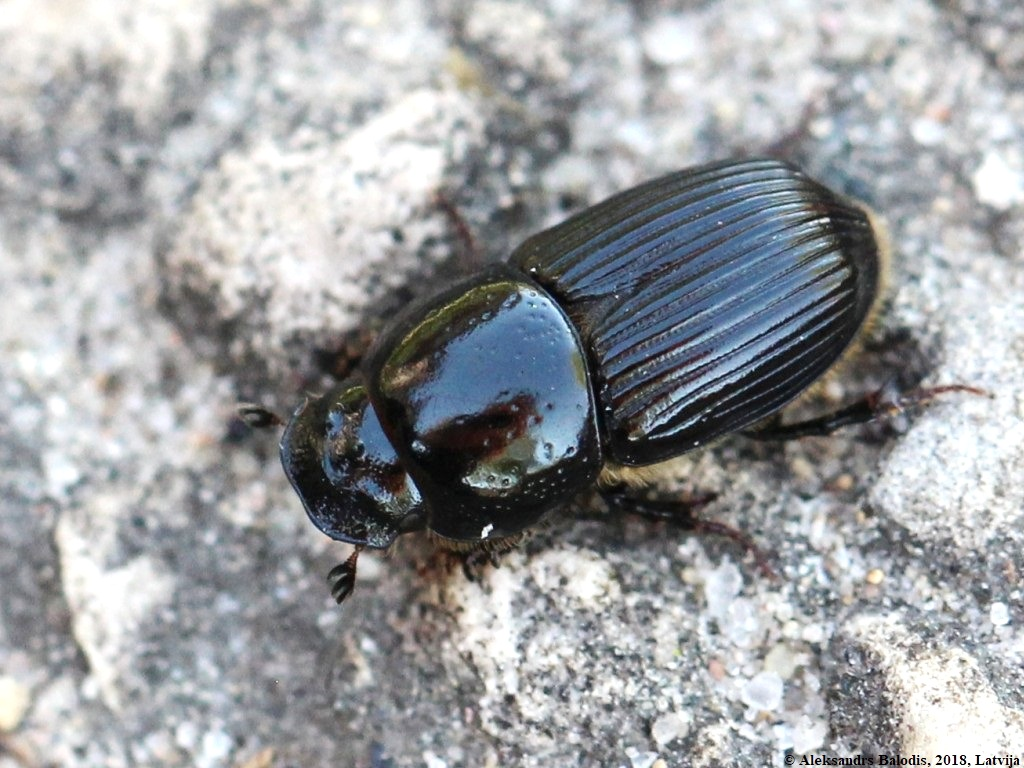

Scientific classification
- Kingdom: Animalia
- Phylum: Arthropoda
- Clade: Pancrustacea
- Class: Insecta
- Order: Coleoptera
- Suborder: Polyphaga
- Infraorder: Scarabaeiformia
- Family: Scarabaeidae
- Genus: Eupleurus
- Species: E. subterraneus

Binomial name
- Eupleurus subterraneus (Linnaeus, 1758)

Synonyms
- Scarabaeus subterraneus Linnaeus, 1758; Aphodius subterraneus (Linnaeus, 1758); Aphodius (Colobopterus) subterraneus subcarpathicus Roubal, 1936; Aphodius (Eupleurus) subterraneus fuscus Dalla Torre, 1879; Aphodius (Eupleurus) subterraneus ruber Dalla Torre, 1879; Aphodius (Eupleurus) subterraneus rufus Dalla Torre, 1879; Aphodius subterraneus coerulescens Harold, 1861; Eupleurus subterraneus fuscipennis Mulsant, 1842; Scarabaeus sulcatus Fabricius, 1792; Aphodius (Eupleurus) subterraneus krasnojarskicus Dellacasa, 1986

= Eupleurus subterraneus =

Species of beetle

Eupleurus subterraneus is a species of scarab beetle found in Europe, Asia, and North America.

== Description ==
Adults reach a length of about 5–8 mm (0.20–0.31 in). They have an elongate, parallel, longitudinally flattened, shiny, glabrous, black body. The elytra may have a blue metallic shine or might even be bright red.

== Subspecies ==
These two subspecies belong to the species Eupleurus subterraneus:

- Eupleurus subterraneus krasnojarskicus (Dellacasa, 1986) (Russia)
- Eupleurus subterraneus subterraneus (Linnaeus, 1758) (Afghanistan, Albania, Algeria, Armenia, Austria, Belarus, Belgium, Bosnia Herzegovina, Bulgaria, China [Xinjiang, Xizang], Croatia, Czech Republic, Denmark, Estonia, Finland, France, Georgia, Germany, Great Britain, Greece, Hungary, Ireland, Italy, Kazakhstan, Korea, Kyrgyzstan, Latvia, Lithuania, Mongolia, Morocco, Netherlands, Poland, Romania, Russia, Russia Far East, Siberia, Slovakia, Slovenia, Spain, Sweden, Switzerland, Tajikistan, Turkey, Turkmenistan, Ukraine, Uzbekistan, Canada [New Brunswick, Nova Scotia, Ontario, Quebec], United States [Maine, Maryland])

== Taxonomy ==
This species was formerly a member of the genus Aphodius.
