= Cephalocyclus pseudofuliginosus =

Scientific classification
- Kingdom: Animalia
- Phylum: Arthropoda
- Clade: Pancrustacea
- Class: Insecta
- Order: Coleoptera
- Suborder: Polyphaga
- Infraorder: Scarabaeiformia
- Family: Scarabaeidae
- Genus: Cephalocyclus
- Species: C. pseudofuliginosus

Binomial name
- Cephalocyclus pseudofuliginosus Dellacasa, Dellacasa & Gordon, 2011

Species of beetle

Cephalocyclus pseudofuliginosus is a species of beetle of the family Scarabaeidae. It is found in Mexico (Oaxaca).

== Description ==
Adults reach a length of about 6.5–7.5 mm (0.26–0.30 in). They have an oval-elongate, moderately convex, rather shiny, almost glabrous, brownish body. The head and pronotum are somewhat darker than the elytra.

== Life history ==
Specimens have been found in horse dung.

== Etymology ==
The species name is derived from Greek pseudo (meaning false) and the name fuliginosus and refers to its similarity to Cephalocyclus fuliginosus.
