= Mendidius pseudobidens =

Scientific classification
- Kingdom: Animalia
- Phylum: Arthropoda
- Clade: Pancrustacea
- Class: Insecta
- Order: Coleoptera
- Suborder: Polyphaga
- Infraorder: Scarabaeiformia
- Family: Scarabaeidae
- Genus: Mendidius
- Species: M. pseudobidens

Binomial name
- Mendidius pseudobidens (Balthasar, 1941)

Synonyms
- Aphodius (Mendidius) pseudobidens Balthasar, 1941

Species of beetle

Mendidius pseudobidens is a species of beetle of the family Scarabaeidae. It is found in northern China.

== Description ==
Adults reach a length of about 5–5.5 mm (0.20–0.22 in). They are very similar to Mendidius bidens, but the head and pronotum are more brown, the sides of the pronotum (especially anteriorly) have a yellow edge, the scutellum is pale with a darker margin and the elytra are yellowish-brown, with the sutural margin darkened. The underside is brown and the legs are pale reddish-brown.
