= Mendidius granulifrons =

Scientific classification
- Kingdom: Animalia
- Phylum: Arthropoda
- Clade: Pancrustacea
- Class: Insecta
- Order: Coleoptera
- Suborder: Polyphaga
- Infraorder: Scarabaeiformia
- Family: Scarabaeidae
- Genus: Mendidius
- Species: M. granulifrons

Binomial name
- Mendidius granulifrons (Fairmaire, 1883)

Synonyms
- Aphodius granulifrons Fairmaire, 1883

Species of beetle

Mendidius granulifrons is a species of beetle of the family Scarabaeidae. It is found in Algeria, Morocco and Saudi Arabia.

== Description ==
Adults reach a length of about 4.5 mm (0.18 in). They are very similar to Mendidius palmetincolus, but the base, sides, and disc of the elytra are darker.
