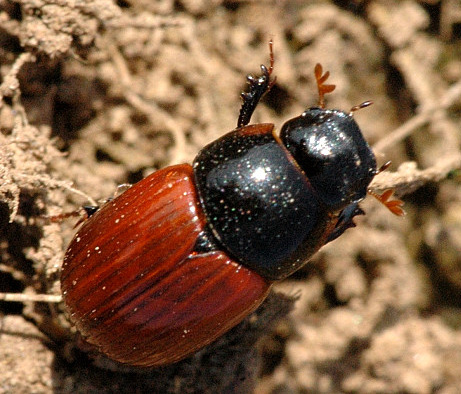
- Aphodius fimetarius Ardennes, Belgium

Scientific classification
- Kingdom: Animalia
- Phylum: Arthropoda
- Clade: Pancrustacea
- Class: Insecta
- Order: Coleoptera
- Suborder: Polyphaga
- Infraorder: Scarabaeiformia
- Family: Scarabaeidae
- Genus: Aphodius
- Species: A. fimetarius

Binomial name
- Aphodius fimetarius (Linnaeus, 1758)

Synonyms
- Scarabaeus fimetarius Linnaeus, 1758; Aphodius fimetarius nigroconcolor Schweiger, 1949; Aphodius fimetarius mourguesi Jacquet, 1938; Aphodius fimetarius paradoxus Hoffmann, 1929; Aphodius fimetarius bicolorellus Schmidt, 1922; Aphodius fimetarius bicoloratus Schmidt, 1917; Aphodius fimetarius castaneus Bouskell, 1901; Aphodius cardinalis Reitter, 1892; Aphodius cinnamomeus Harold, 1863; Aphodius fimetivorus Gistel, 1857; Aphodius fimetarius bicolor Mulsant, 1842; Aphodius fimetarius hypopygialis Mulsant, 1842]; Aphodius fimetarius imperfectus Mulsant, 1842; Aphodius fimetarius maculipennis Mulsant, 1842; Aphodius fimetarius punctulatus Mulsant, 1842; Aphodius fimetarius subluteus Mulsant, 1842; Aphodius fimetarius monticola Heer, 1841; Aphodius orophilus Charpentier, 1825; Scarabaeus bicolor Fourcroy, 1785

= Aphodius fimetarius =

Farmer Scarab Beetle

Species of beetle

Aphodius fimetarius, commonly known as the farmer scarab beetle, is a species of scarab beetle found in the Palaearctic Region (including Europe), the northern part of the Oriental Region, as well as in North America and Australia.

== Description ==
Adults reach a length of about 5–7.5 mm (0.20–0.30 in). They have a black body, with the elytra and anterior angles of the pronotum red.

== Life history ==
Specimens have been found in horse and cow dung.

== Etymology ==
The farmer scarab beetle gets its common name from its scientific name, with fimetarius meaning 'a farmer'.
