= Cephalocyclus carmenae =

Scientific classification
- Kingdom: Animalia
- Phylum: Arthropoda
- Clade: Pancrustacea
- Class: Insecta
- Order: Coleoptera
- Suborder: Polyphaga
- Infraorder: Scarabaeiformia
- Family: Scarabaeidae
- Genus: Cephalocyclus
- Species: C. carmenae

Binomial name
- Cephalocyclus carmenae Dellacasa, Dellacasa & Gordon, 2007

Species of beetle

Cephalocyclus carmenae is a species of beetle of the family Scarabaeidae. It is found in Mexico (Coahuila, Nuevo León).

== Description ==
Adults reach a length of about 5.5–7 mm (0.22–0.28 in). They have an oblong, convex, dull, glabrous, piceous body. The margins of the clypeus and the sides of the pronotum are paler and the legs are reddish-brown. The antennal club is rufo-testaceous.

== Life history ==
Specimens have been found in horse dung.

== Etymology ==
The species is named in honour of the fiancée of one of the authors, Dr. Carmen Fresi.
