= Planolinellus grzegorzi =

Scientific classification
- Kingdom: Animalia
- Phylum: Arthropoda
- Clade: Pancrustacea
- Class: Insecta
- Order: Coleoptera
- Suborder: Polyphaga
- Infraorder: Scarabaeiformia
- Family: Scarabaeidae
- Genus: Planolinellus
- Species: P. grzegorzi

Binomial name
- Planolinellus grzegorzi Minkina, 2017

Species of beetle

Planolinellus grzegorzi is a species of beetle of the family Scarabaeidae. It is found in China (Sichuan).

== Description ==
Adults reach a length of about 4.3–4.9 mm (0.17–0.19 in). They have an elongate, convex, rather strongly shiny, glabrous, black body, with the apex of elytra paler yellowish.

== Etymology ==
The species is named in honour of the a friend of the author, Grzegorz Jelonek.
