= Neotrichonotulus urangai =

Scientific classification
- Kingdom: Animalia
- Phylum: Arthropoda
- Clade: Pancrustacea
- Class: Insecta
- Order: Coleoptera
- Suborder: Polyphaga
- Infraorder: Scarabaeiformia
- Family: Scarabaeidae
- Genus: Neotrichonotulus
- Species: N. urangai

Binomial name
- Neotrichonotulus urangai (Islas, 1955)

Synonyms
- Aphodius (Trichonotulus) urangai Islas, 1955

Species of beetle

Neotrichonotulus urangai is a species of beetle of the family Scarabaeidae. It is found in Mexico (México).

== Description ==
Adults reach a length of about 4–4.5 mm (0.16–0.18 in). They have an elongate, subcylindrical, convex, somewhat shiny body. The head is glabrous, while the pronotum and elytra have short pale setae. They are blackish, with the margin of the clypeus, sides of the pronotum and apex of the elytra dark reddish-brown. The legs are brownish and the antennal club is piceous.

== Life history ==
Specimens have been collected in burrows of Pappogeomys.
