= Trichonotulus scrofa =

Scientific classification
- Kingdom: Animalia
- Phylum: Arthropoda
- Clade: Pancrustacea
- Class: Insecta
- Order: Coleoptera
- Suborder: Polyphaga
- Infraorder: Scarabaeiformia
- Family: Scarabaeidae
- Genus: Trichonotulus
- Species: T. scrofa

Binomial name
- Trichonotulus scrofa (Fabricius, 1787)

Synonyms
- Scarabaeus scrofa Fabricius, 1787; Aphodius (Trichonotus) merdaroides Reitter, 1896; Aphodius cinereus Mulsant & Rey, 1870; Aphodius stercoris Gistel, 1857; Aphodius mongolicus Mannerheim, 1852; Trichonotus scropha setiger Mulsant, 1842; Scarabaeus fuscus Rossi, 1792; Scarabaeus tomentosus Kugelann, 1792; Scarabaeus minutus Herbst, 1789

Species of beetle

Trichonotulus scrofa is a species of beetle of the family Scarabaeidae. It is found in the Holarctic region.

== Description ==
Adults reach a length of about 3–4 mm (0.12–0.16 in). They have an oval-subelongate, convex, nearly dull, pubescent, brown-blackish body, with the elytra reddish apically.

== Distribution ==
Palaearctic: Afghanistan, Albania, Armenia, Austria, Belarus, Belgium, Bosnia and Herzegovina, Bulgaria, Croatia, the Czech Republic, Denmark, Estonia, Finland, France, Georgia, Germany, Greece, Hungary, Iran, Italy, Kazakhstan, Korea, Kyrgyzstan, Latvia, Lithuania, Macedonia, Mongolia, Montenegro, Morocco, the Netherlands, Norway, Pakistan, Poland, Portugal, Romania, Russia (including the Russian Far East), Serbia, Slovakia, Slovenia, Spain, Sweden, Switzerland, Tajikistan, Turkey, Turkmenistan and Ukraine. Nearctic: Canada (New Brunswick, Newfoundland, Ontario, Quebec), the United States (Maine, Vermont).

== Life history ==
Specimens have been collected from cow, human and horse dung.
