= Cephalocyclus puncticeps =

Scientific classification
- Kingdom: Animalia
- Phylum: Arthropoda
- Clade: Pancrustacea
- Class: Insecta
- Order: Coleoptera
- Suborder: Polyphaga
- Infraorder: Scarabaeiformia
- Family: Scarabaeidae
- Genus: Cephalocyclus
- Species: C. puncticeps

Binomial name
- Cephalocyclus puncticeps (Harold, 1862)

Synonyms
- Aphodius puncticeps Harold, 1862

Species of beetle

Cephalocyclus puncticeps is a species of beetle of the family Scarabaeidae. It is found in Mexico (Jalisco, México, Puebla).

== Description ==
Adults reach a length of about 3.5–4.5 mm (0.14–0.18 in). They have an oblong, moderately convex, shiny body. The head and pronotum are blackish, the latter with reddish sides. The elytra are piceous or vaguely testaceous, the antennal club is testaceous and the legs are piceous.
