= Cephalocyclus lagoi =

Scientific classification
- Kingdom: Animalia
- Phylum: Arthropoda
- Clade: Pancrustacea
- Class: Insecta
- Order: Coleoptera
- Suborder: Polyphaga
- Infraorder: Scarabaeiformia
- Family: Scarabaeidae
- Genus: Cephalocyclus
- Species: C. lagoi

Binomial name
- Cephalocyclus lagoi Dellacasa, Dellacasa & Gordon, 2007

Species of beetle

Cephalocyclus lagoi is a species of beetle of the family Scarabaeidae. It is found in Mexico (Coahuila, Nuevo León, Querétaro, San Luis Potosí).

== Description ==
Adults reach a length of about 5–5.5 mm (0.20–0.22 in). They have an elongate, convex, shiny, glabrous, brownish body. The margin of the clypeus, sides of the pronotum and elytra are reddish-brown, while the legs are reddish and the antennal club is brownish.

== Life history ==
Specimens have been found in cattle and horse dung.

== Etymology ==
The species is named in honour of Paul K. Lago.
