= Mendidius calliger =

Scientific classification
- Kingdom: Animalia
- Phylum: Arthropoda
- Clade: Pancrustacea
- Class: Insecta
- Order: Coleoptera
- Suborder: Polyphaga
- Infraorder: Scarabaeiformia
- Family: Scarabaeidae
- Genus: Mendidius
- Species: M. calliger

Binomial name
- Mendidius calliger (Sahlberg, 1908)

Synonyms
- Aphodius (Mendidius) calliger Sahlberg, 1908

Species of beetle

Mendidius calliger is a species of beetle of the family Scarabaeidae. It is found in Palestine.

== Description ==
Adults reach a length of about 3–4 mm (0.12–0.16 in). They are shiny and black, with the elytra whitish-yellow, with a darkened suture. The legs are light brown.
