= Phaeaphodius kiulungensis =

Scientific classification
- Kingdom: Animalia
- Phylum: Arthropoda
- Clade: Pancrustacea
- Class: Insecta
- Order: Coleoptera
- Suborder: Polyphaga
- Infraorder: Scarabaeiformia
- Family: Scarabaeidae
- Genus: Phaeaphodius
- Species: P. kiulungensis

Binomial name
- Phaeaphodius kiulungensis (Balthasar, 1932)

Synonyms
- Aphodius (Limaroides) kiulungensis Balthasar, 1932

Species of beetle

Phaeaphodius kiulungensis is a species of beetle of the family Scarabaeidae. It is found in China (Fujian, Sichuan, Xizang).

== Description ==
Adults reach a length of about 4.5–6 mm (0.18–0.24 in). They have a strongly convex, shiny, glabrous body. The head, pronotum and scutellum are black, while the elytra are yellowish-brown, sometimes with a slightly reddish tint. The suture is blackened.
