= Cephalocyclus stebnickae =

Scientific classification
- Kingdom: Animalia
- Phylum: Arthropoda
- Clade: Pancrustacea
- Class: Insecta
- Order: Coleoptera
- Suborder: Polyphaga
- Infraorder: Scarabaeiformia
- Family: Scarabaeidae
- Genus: Cephalocyclus
- Species: C. stebnickae

Binomial name
- Cephalocyclus stebnickae Deloya & Ibanez-bernal, 2000

Species of beetle

Cephalocyclus stebnickae is a species of beetle of the family Scarabaeidae. It is found in Mexico (Chiapas).

== Description ==
Adults reach a length of about 7–8.5 mm (0.28–0.33 in). They have an elongate, feebly convex, moderately shiny, almost glabrous body, with tiny yellowish hairs on the preapical declivity of the elytra.

== Life history ==
Specimens have been found in cattle and horse dung.
