= Planolinus pratensis =

Scientific classification
- Kingdom: Animalia
- Phylum: Arthropoda
- Clade: Pancrustacea
- Class: Insecta
- Order: Coleoptera
- Suborder: Polyphaga
- Infraorder: Scarabaeiformia
- Family: Scarabaeidae
- Genus: Planolinus
- Species: P. pratensis

Binomial name
- Planolinus pratensis (Nomura & Nakane, 1951)

Synonyms
- Aphodius (Agrilinus) pratensis Nomura & Nakane, 1951

Species of beetle

Planolinus pratensis is a species of beetle of the family Scarabaeidae. It is found in Japan, the Russian Far East and Siberia.

== Description ==
Adults reach a length of about 4–5 mm (0.16–0.20 in). They have an elongate, glossy, black body, with the margins of the head and the sides of the pronotum reddish. The elytra are reddish-brown or black, in which case the apex is reddish.
