= Nialaphodius nigrita =

Scientific classification
- Kingdom: Animalia
- Phylum: Arthropoda
- Clade: Pancrustacea
- Class: Insecta
- Order: Coleoptera
- Suborder: Polyphaga
- Infraorder: Scarabaeiformia
- Family: Scarabaeidae
- Genus: Nialaphodius
- Species: N. nigrita

Binomial name
- Nialaphodius nigrita (Fabricius, 1801)

Synonyms
- Aphodius nigrita Fabricius, 1801; Aphodius (Pharaphodius) pervicax Balthasar, 1942; Aphodius binominatus Schmidt, 1907; Aphodius tuberifrons Fairmaire, 1903; Aphodius granarius guadeloupensis Fleutiaux & Sallé, 1889; Aphodius expertus Harold, 1871; Aphodius vestiarius Horn, 1870; Aphodius paivanus Wollaston, 1867; Aphodius cuniculus Chevrolat, 1865; Aphodius nigritulus Boheman, 1857; Aphodius tenebrosus Dejean, 1833

Species of beetle

Nialaphodius nigrita is a species of beetle of the family Scarabaeidae.

== Description ==
Adults reach a length of about 3.5–5.5 mm (0.14–0.22 in). The body is strongly convex and the head is densely punctate. The pronotum has punctures of two sizes (fine and coarse) and a posterior margin without a posterior marginal line.

== Distribution ==
Nearctic: USA (Florida, Georgia, South Carolina, Texas). Neotropical: Belize, Bolivia, Brazil (Amazonas, Bahia, Distrito Federal, Espírito Santo, Maranhão, Mato Grosso, Mato Grosso do Sul, Minas Gerais, Rio de Janeiro, Rondônia, Roraima, São Paulo), Chile, Colombia, Ecuador, El Salvador, Grenadines, Honduras, Martinique, Mexico (Chiapas, Durango, Guerrero, Hidalgo, Jalisco, Nayarit, Oaxaca, Querétaro, Quintana Roo, San Luis Potosí, Sonora, Veracruz, Yucatán), Panama, Paraguay, Peru, Puerto Rico, Saint Vincent, Suriname, Venezuela. Afrotropical: Angola, Benin, Burkina Faso, Burundi, Cameroon, Chad, Gambia, Ghana, Ivory Coast, Kenya, Malawi, Niger, Democratic Republic of the Congo, Republic of Guinea, Rwanda, Senegal, Sudan, Tanzania, Zambia, Cape Verde, Madagascar, Mascarene, the Seychelles.

== Life history ==
Specimens have been collected in Urochloa brizantha pasture regions in cattle dung.
