= Orodaliscoides rugosiceps =

Scientific classification
- Kingdom: Animalia
- Phylum: Arthropoda
- Clade: Pancrustacea
- Class: Insecta
- Order: Coleoptera
- Suborder: Polyphaga
- Infraorder: Scarabaeiformia
- Family: Scarabaeidae
- Genus: Orodaliscoides
- Species: O. rugosiceps

Binomial name
- Orodaliscoides rugosiceps (Harold, 1859)

Synonyms
- Aphodius rugosiceps Harold, 1859; Aphodius chilensis Erichson, 1848

Species of beetle

Orodaliscoides rugosiceps is a species of beetle of the family Scarabaeidae. It is found in Chile and Peru.

== Description ==
Adults reach a length of about 5–7 mm (0.20–0.28 in). They have a very elongate, convex, shiny, nearly glabrous (only the elytra are sparsely pubescent laterally and toward the apex), piceous-reddish body, with the elytra paler.
