= Neotrichonotulus perotensis =

Scientific classification
- Kingdom: Animalia
- Phylum: Arthropoda
- Clade: Pancrustacea
- Class: Insecta
- Order: Coleoptera
- Suborder: Polyphaga
- Infraorder: Scarabaeiformia
- Family: Scarabaeidae
- Genus: Neotrichonotulus
- Species: N. perotensis

Binomial name
- Neotrichonotulus perotensis (Deloya & Lobo, 1996)

Synonyms
- Aphodius (Trichonotulus) perotensis Deloya & Lobo, 1996

Species of beetle

Neotrichonotulus perotensis is a species of beetle of the family Scarabaeidae. It is found in Mexico (Veracruz).

== Description ==
Adults reach a length of about 4.5–5 mm (0.18–0.20 in). They have an elongate, subcylindrical, convex body. The head is shiny, the pronotum is also shiny, but less so and the elytra are subopaque. The head is glabrous, while the pronotum and elytra have short hairs. They are blackish, with the margin of the clypeus reddish, the legs piceous and the antennal club blackish.

== Life history ==
Specimens have been collected in burrows of Pappogeomys merriami.
