= Mendidius beluchistanicus =

Scientific classification
- Kingdom: Animalia
- Phylum: Arthropoda
- Clade: Pancrustacea
- Class: Insecta
- Order: Coleoptera
- Suborder: Polyphaga
- Infraorder: Scarabaeiformia
- Family: Scarabaeidae
- Genus: Mendidius
- Species: M. beluchistanicus

Binomial name
- Mendidius beluchistanicus (Petrovitz, 1962)

Synonyms
- Aphodius (Mendidius) beluchistanicus Petrovitz, 1962

Species of beetle

Mendidius beluchistanicus is a species of beetle of the family Scarabaeidae. It is found in Iran, Iraq, Saudi Arabia and the United Arab Emirates.

== Description ==
Adults reach a length of about 5–5.3 mm (0.20–0.21 in). They have an almost cylindrical, shiny, glabrous, light yellowish-brown body, with the elytral suture darkened. The antennae are yellow and the sides of the head and the pronotum are fringed with light-colored hairs.
