= Phaeaphodius pupillus =

Scientific classification
- Kingdom: Animalia
- Phylum: Arthropoda
- Clade: Pancrustacea
- Class: Insecta
- Order: Coleoptera
- Suborder: Polyphaga
- Infraorder: Scarabaeiformia
- Family: Scarabaeidae
- Genus: Phaeaphodius
- Species: P. pupillus

Binomial name
- Phaeaphodius pupillus (Balthasar, 1961)

Synonyms
- Aphodius (Phaeaphodius) pupillus Balthasar, 1961

Species of beetle

Phaeaphodius pupillus is a species of beetle of the family Scarabaeidae. It is found in Afghanistan and Uzbekistan.

== Description ==
Adults reach a length of about 3.8–4.5 mm (0.15–0.18 in). They have a fairly parallel, strongly convex, shiny, glabrous body. The head, pronotum and scutellum are black, with the anterior corners of the latter sometimes reddish. The elytra are brown and the legs are yellowish-brown.
