= Hornosus turnbowi =

Scientific classification
- Kingdom: Animalia
- Phylum: Arthropoda
- Clade: Pancrustacea
- Class: Insecta
- Order: Coleoptera
- Suborder: Polyphaga
- Infraorder: Scarabaeiformia
- Family: Scarabaeidae
- Genus: Hornosus
- Species: H. turnbowi

Binomial name
- Hornosus turnbowi Dellacasa, Dellacasa & Gordon, 2015

Species of beetle

Hornosus turnbowi is a species of beetle of the family Scarabaeidae. It is found in Mexico (Nuevo León).

== Description ==
Adults reach a length of about 4–4.5 mm (0.16–0.18 in). They have an oblong, moderately convex, glossy, mostly glabrous body. The head and pronotum are blackish, the latter with the sides brownish-yellow. The elytra are also brownish-yellow, with a dark brown stripe (interrupted by a yellowish spot), and one more dark brown stripe. The legs are yellowish-brown and the antennal club is piceous.

== Etymology ==
The species is named in honour of Central American Cerambycidae specialist Robert H. Turnbow, Jr., who collected most of the type series.
