= Mendidius atricolor =

Scientific classification
- Kingdom: Animalia
- Phylum: Arthropoda
- Clade: Pancrustacea
- Class: Insecta
- Order: Coleoptera
- Suborder: Polyphaga
- Infraorder: Scarabaeiformia
- Family: Scarabaeidae
- Genus: Mendidius
- Species: M. atricolor

Binomial name
- Mendidius atricolor (Reitter, 1892)

Synonyms
- Aphodius (Mendidius) atricolor Reitter, 1892

Species of beetle

Mendidius atricolor is a species of beetle of the family Scarabaeidae. It is found in Afghanistan and Tajikistan.

== Description ==
Adults reach a length of about 4.5 mm (0.18 in). They have an elongate, glabrous, shining, black body, with brown legs.
