= Cephalocyclus mexicanus =

Scientific classification
- Kingdom: Animalia
- Phylum: Arthropoda
- Clade: Pancrustacea
- Class: Insecta
- Order: Coleoptera
- Suborder: Polyphaga
- Infraorder: Scarabaeiformia
- Family: Scarabaeidae
- Genus: Cephalocyclus
- Species: C. mexicanus

Binomial name
- Cephalocyclus mexicanus (Harold, 1862)

Synonyms
- Aphodius mexicanus Harold, 1862; Aphodius omiltemius Bates, 1889; Aphodius ambiguus Dejean, 1833

Species of beetle

Cephalocyclus mexicanus is a species of beetle of the family Scarabaeidae. It is found in Guatemala and Mexico (Aguascalientes, Distrito Federal, Durango, Guerrero, Hidalgo, Jalisco, México, Michoacán, Morelos, Nayarit, Oaxaca, Puebla, Querétaro, Sinaloa, Tlaxcala, Veracruz, Zacatecas).

== Description ==
Adults reach a length of about 5–6 mm (0.20–0.24 in). They have a moderately convex, shiny, glabrous, piceous body. The margin of the clypeus, sides of the pronotum and the legs are testaceous.

== Life history ==
Specimens have been found in cattle and horse dung.
