= Planolinus fasciatus =

Scientific classification
- Kingdom: Animalia
- Phylum: Arthropoda
- Clade: Pancrustacea
- Class: Insecta
- Order: Coleoptera
- Suborder: Polyphaga
- Infraorder: Scarabaeiformia
- Family: Scarabaeidae
- Genus: Planolinus
- Species: P. fasciatus

Binomial name
- Planolinus fasciatus (Olivier, 1789)

Synonyms
- Scarabaeus fasciatus Olivier, 1789; Aphodius (Agrilinus) putridus transitus Reitter, 1892; Aphodius hirundinarius Gistel, 1857; Aphodius vitulinus Gistel, 1857; Aphodius uliginosus Hardy, 1847; Scarabaeus foetidus Fabricius, 1792; Scarabaeus sus Kugelann, 1792; Scarabaeus putridus Herbst, 1789

Species of beetle

Planolinus fasciatus is a species of beetle of the family Scarabaeidae. It is found in Austria, Belarus, Belgium, Bosnia and Herzegovina, Bulgaria, Croatia, the Czech Republic, Denmark, Estonia, the Faroe Islands, Finland, France, Georgia, Germany, Great Britain, Hungary, Iceland, Iran, Kazakhstan, Korea, Kyrgyzstan, Latvia, Lithuania, the Netherlands, Mongolia, Norway, Poland, Portugal, Romania, Russia (including the Russian Far East and Siberia), Slovakia, Spain, Sweden, Switzerland, Turkey and Ukraine.

== Description ==
Adults reach a length of about 3.5–4.5 mm (0.14–0.18 in). They have an obovate, convex, shiny, glabrous, blackish body, with reddish elytra.
