= Cephalocyclus luridiventris =

Scientific classification
- Kingdom: Animalia
- Phylum: Arthropoda
- Clade: Pancrustacea
- Class: Insecta
- Order: Coleoptera
- Suborder: Polyphaga
- Infraorder: Scarabaeiformia
- Family: Scarabaeidae
- Genus: Cephalocyclus
- Species: C. luridiventris

Binomial name
- Cephalocyclus luridiventris (Harold, 1862)

Synonyms
- Aphodius luridiventris Harold, 1862

Species of beetle

Cephalocyclus luridiventris is a species of beetle of the family Scarabaeidae. It is found in Mexico (Distrito Federal, Oaxaca, Puebla).

== Description ==
Adults reach a length of about 7–8 mm (0.28–0.31 in). They have an oblong, feebly convex, moderately shiny, piceous body, with the legs testaceous-reddish and the antennal club dark testaceous.
