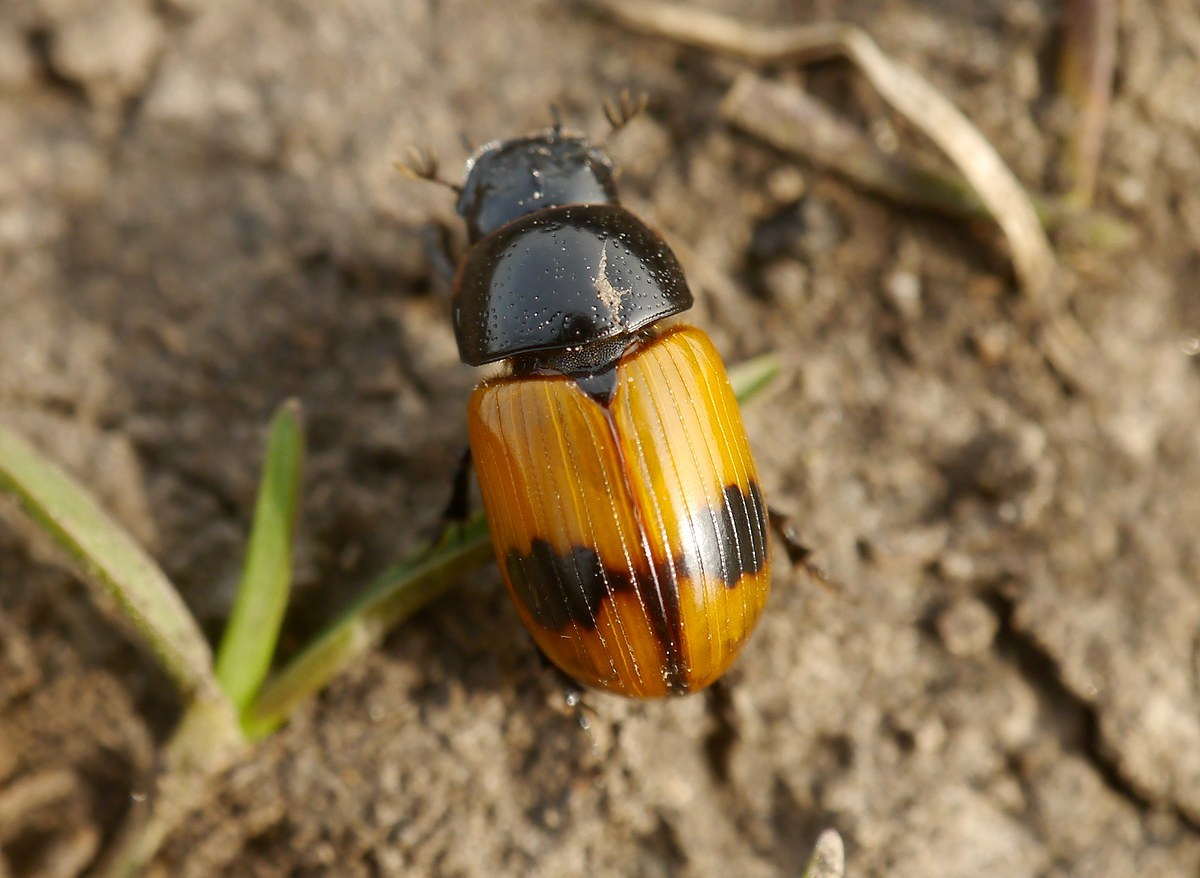

Scientific classification
- Kingdom: Animalia
- Phylum: Arthropoda
- Clade: Pancrustacea
- Class: Insecta
- Order: Coleoptera
- Suborder: Polyphaga
- Infraorder: Scarabaeiformia
- Family: Scarabaeidae
- Genus: Aphodius
- Species: A. coniugatus

Binomial name
- Aphodius coniugatus (Panzer, 1795)

Synonyms
- Scarabaeus coniugatus Panzer, 1795; Aphodius conjugatus angustifasciata Dalla Torre, 1879; Aphodius conjugatus interrupta Dalla Torre, 1879; Aphodius conjugatus Mulsant, 1842; Aphodius conjugatus fasciatus Mulsant, 1842; Aphodius fasciatus Fabricius, 1801; Scarabaeus unifasciatus Fabricius, 1801

= Aphodius coniugatus =

Species of beetle

Aphodius coniugatus is a species of beetle of the family Scarabaeidae. It is found in Armenia, Austria, Azerbaijan, Bosnia Herzegovina, Croatia, the Czech Republic, France, Georgia, Germany, Greece, Hungary, Italy, Moldova, Montenegro, Poland, Romania, Russia, Slovakia, Spain, Switzerland, Turkey, Turkmenistan and Ukraine.

== Description ==
Adults reach a length of about 8–10 mm (0.31–0.39 in). They have a strongly convex, shiny, glabrous body. The forebody, scutellum, and underside are black, with the anterior angles of the pronotum yellowish. The elytra are yellow to reddish-yellow, with a black transverse band. The legs are blackish-brown.
