= Cephalocyclus halffteri =

Scientific classification
- Kingdom: Animalia
- Phylum: Arthropoda
- Clade: Pancrustacea
- Class: Insecta
- Order: Coleoptera
- Suborder: Polyphaga
- Infraorder: Scarabaeiformia
- Family: Scarabaeidae
- Genus: Cephalocyclus
- Species: C. halffteri

Binomial name
- Cephalocyclus halffteri Dellacasa, Dellacasa & Gordon, 2007

Species of beetle

Cephalocyclus halffteri is a species of beetle of the family Scarabaeidae. It is found in Mexico (Guerrero, México).

== Description ==
Adults reach a length of about 6–7 mm (0.24–0.28 in). They have a short oval, convex body, with the head, pronotum and scutellum moderately shiny in males, but dull in females. They are piceous, with the margin of the clypeus, sides of the pronotum and elytra paler. The legs are piceous and the antennal club is blackish.

== Life history ==
Specimens have been found in horse dung.

== Etymology ==
The species is named in honour of professor Gonzalo Halffter.
