= Phaeaphodius roddi =

Scientific classification
- Kingdom: Animalia
- Phylum: Arthropoda
- Clade: Pancrustacea
- Class: Insecta
- Order: Coleoptera
- Suborder: Polyphaga
- Infraorder: Scarabaeiformia
- Family: Scarabaeidae
- Genus: Phaeaphodius
- Species: P. roddi

Binomial name
- Phaeaphodius roddi (Koshantschikov, 1911)

Synonyms
- Aphodius (Phaeaphodius) roddi Koshantschikov, 1911

Species of beetle

Phaeaphodius roddi is a species of beetle of the family Scarabaeidae. It is found in Kazakhstan and Russia (including Siberia).

== Description ==
Adults reach a length of about 4.8–6 mm (0.19–0.24 in). They have a slightly convex, glossy, glabrous, black body, with the lateral and apical margins of the elytra translucent and with dark brown legs.
