= Cephalocyclus villosipes =

Scientific classification
- Kingdom: Animalia
- Phylum: Arthropoda
- Clade: Pancrustacea
- Class: Insecta
- Order: Coleoptera
- Suborder: Polyphaga
- Infraorder: Scarabaeiformia
- Family: Scarabaeidae
- Genus: Cephalocyclus
- Species: C. villosipes

Binomial name
- Cephalocyclus villosipes (Harold, 1862)

Synonyms
- Aphodius villosipes Harold, 1862

Species of beetle

Cephalocyclus villosipes is a species of beetle of the family Scarabaeidae. It is found in Mexico (Hidalgo, México, Oaxaca, Puebla, Veracruz).

== Description ==
Adults reach a length of about 8–9 mm (0.31–0.35 in). They have a sub-depressed, elongate, moderately shiny, piceous-reddish body, with the antennal club and legs paler.
