= Mendidius berbericus =

Scientific classification
- Kingdom: Animalia
- Phylum: Arthropoda
- Clade: Pancrustacea
- Class: Insecta
- Order: Coleoptera
- Suborder: Polyphaga
- Infraorder: Scarabaeiformia
- Family: Scarabaeidae
- Genus: Mendidius
- Species: M. berbericus

Binomial name
- Mendidius berbericus (Balthasar, 1941)

Synonyms
- Aphodius berbericus Balthasar, 1941

Species of beetle

Mendidius berbericus is a species of beetle of the family Scarabaeidae. It is found in Algeria, Libya and Morocco.

== Description ==
Adults reach a length of about 4–4.5 mm (0.16–0.18 in). They have an elongate-oval, moderately shiny, glabrous, yellowish-brown body, with the frontal suture blackened. There is a dark spot in the middle of each side of the pronotum, and the scutellum has a dark border. The sutural margin of the elytra is blackish. The legs are yellowish-brown.
