= Cephalocyclus durangoensis =

Scientific classification
- Kingdom: Animalia
- Phylum: Arthropoda
- Clade: Pancrustacea
- Class: Insecta
- Order: Coleoptera
- Suborder: Polyphaga
- Infraorder: Scarabaeiformia
- Family: Scarabaeidae
- Genus: Cephalocyclus
- Species: C. durangoensis

Binomial name
- Cephalocyclus durangoensis (Bates, 1887)

Synonyms
- Aphodius durangoensis Bates, 1887; Aphodius (Platyderides) pugil Balthasar, 1946

Species of beetle

Cephalocyclus durangoensis is a species of beetle of the family Scarabaeidae. It is found in Mexico (Coahuila, Distrito Federal, Durango, México, Michoacán, Nuevo León, Oaxaca).

== Description ==
Adults reach a length of about 6–7 mm (0.24–0.28 in). They have an oval-elongate, moderately convex, shiny, nearly glabrous, brownish body, with the disc of the pronotum and elytral suture darker.

== Life history ==
Specimens have been found in cattle and horse dung.
