= Stenotothorax badipes =

Scientific classification
- Kingdom: Animalia
- Phylum: Arthropoda
- Clade: Pancrustacea
- Class: Insecta
- Order: Coleoptera
- Suborder: Polyphaga
- Infraorder: Scarabaeiformia
- Family: Scarabaeidae
- Genus: Stenotothorax
- Species: S. badipes

Binomial name
- Stenotothorax badipes (Melsheimer, 1845)

Synonyms
- Aphodius badipes Melsheimer, 1845; Aphodius oblongus Say, 1823

Species of beetle

Stenotothorax badipes is a species of beetle of the family Scarabaeidae. It is found in Canada (New Brunswick, Ontario, Quebec) and the United States (Arkansas, Indiana, Iowa, Kansas, Maryland, Minnesota, Montana, Nebraska, Oklahoma, Pennsylvania, South Carolina, Wisconsin).

== Description ==
Adults reach a length of about 7–9 mm (0.28–0.35 in). They have an oval-elongate, shiny, moderately convex, nearly glabrous, piceous-black body. The legs are brown-reddish and the antennae are reddish with a piceous club.
