= Mendidius baigakumi =

Scientific classification
- Kingdom: Animalia
- Phylum: Arthropoda
- Clade: Pancrustacea
- Class: Insecta
- Order: Coleoptera
- Suborder: Polyphaga
- Infraorder: Scarabaeiformia
- Family: Scarabaeidae
- Genus: Mendidius
- Species: M. baigakumi

Binomial name
- Mendidius baigakumi (Koshantschikov, 1911)

Synonyms
- Aphodius (Mendidius) baigakumi Koshantschikov, 1911

Species of beetle

Mendidius baigakumi is a species of beetle of the family Scarabaeidae. It is found in Kazakhstan, Russia and Uzbekistan.

== Description ==
Adults reach a length of about 2.7–3 mm (0.11–0.12 in). They have an elongate, quite strongly convex, shiny, glabrous body. The head and pronotum are black with lighter sides. The scutellum is brown and the elytra are yellowish-brown with a dark sutural interval. The legs are reddish-brown.
