= Cephalocyclus gravidus =

Scientific classification
- Kingdom: Animalia
- Phylum: Arthropoda
- Clade: Pancrustacea
- Class: Insecta
- Order: Coleoptera
- Suborder: Polyphaga
- Infraorder: Scarabaeiformia
- Family: Scarabaeidae
- Genus: Cephalocyclus
- Species: C. gravidus

Binomial name
- Cephalocyclus gravidus (Harold, 1863)

Synonyms
- Aphodius gravidus Harold, 1863

Species of beetle

Cephalocyclus gravidus is a species of beetle of the family Scarabaeidae. It is found in Mexico (Chihuahua, Distrito Federal, Durango, Hidalgo, Jalisco, México, Michoacán, Morelos).

== Description ==
Adults reach a length of about 6–8 mm (0.24–0.31 in). They have a convex, moderately shiny, nearly glabrous, piceous body, with the sides of the pronotum, elytra and legs paler, and with the antennal club yellowish.

== Life history ==
Specimens have been found in cattle and horse dung.
