= Cephalocyclus ordonezi =

Scientific classification
- Kingdom: Animalia
- Phylum: Arthropoda
- Clade: Pancrustacea
- Class: Insecta
- Order: Coleoptera
- Suborder: Polyphaga
- Infraorder: Scarabaeiformia
- Family: Scarabaeidae
- Genus: Cephalocyclus
- Species: C. ordonezi

Binomial name
- Cephalocyclus ordonezi Dellacasa, Dellacasa & Gordon, 2007

Species of beetle

Cephalocyclus ordonezi is a species of beetle of the family Scarabaeidae. It is found in Mexico (México, Puebla).

== Description ==
Adults reach a length of about 5.5–6 mm (0.22–0.24 in). They have a shortly oval, moderately convex, sub-shiny, glabrous body. The head and pronotum are piceous, while the margin of the clypeus, sides of the pronotum, elytra, legs and antennal club are reddish-brown.

== Life history ==
Specimens have been found in cattle dung.

== Etymology ==
The species is named in honour of M. Ordóñez Reséndiz.
