= Mendidius osiris =

Scientific classification
- Kingdom: Animalia
- Phylum: Arthropoda
- Clade: Pancrustacea
- Class: Insecta
- Order: Coleoptera
- Suborder: Polyphaga
- Infraorder: Scarabaeiformia
- Family: Scarabaeidae
- Genus: Mendidius
- Species: M. osiris

Binomial name
- Mendidius osiris (Koshantschikov, 1916)

Synonyms
- Aphodius (Mendidius) osiris Koshantschikov, 1916

Species of beetle

Mendidius osiris is a species of beetle of the family Scarabaeidae. It is found in Egypt.

== Description ==
Adults reach a length of about 8.5 mm (0.33 in). They have a shiny, glabrous, yellowish-brown body, with the head and the discal spots on the pronotum darker brown.
