= Cephalocyclus hogei =

Scientific classification
- Kingdom: Animalia
- Phylum: Arthropoda
- Clade: Pancrustacea
- Class: Insecta
- Order: Coleoptera
- Suborder: Polyphaga
- Infraorder: Scarabaeiformia
- Family: Scarabaeidae
- Genus: Cephalocyclus
- Species: C. hogei

Binomial name
- Cephalocyclus hogei (Bates, 1887)

Synonyms
- Aphodius hogei Bates, 1887; Aphodius (Platyderides) transversus Robinson, 1940

Species of beetle

Cephalocyclus hogei is a species of beetle of the family Scarabaeidae. It is found in Guatemala and Mexico (Coahuila, Distrito Federal, Durango, Hidalgo, México, Michoacán, Morelos, Oaxaca, Puebla, Querétaro, Tlaxcala, Veracruz).

== Description ==
Adults reach a length of about 4–6 mm (0.16–0.24 in). They have an oblong, moderately convex, nearly glabrous body, with the head and pronotum shiny, while the elytra are almost dull. They are piceous, with the elytra brownish.

== Life history ==
Specimens have been found in cattle, horse and sheep dung.
