= Stenotothorax hibernalis =

Scientific classification
- Kingdom: Animalia
- Phylum: Arthropoda
- Clade: Pancrustacea
- Class: Insecta
- Order: Coleoptera
- Suborder: Polyphaga
- Infraorder: Scarabaeiformia
- Family: Scarabaeidae
- Genus: Stenotothorax
- Species: S. hibernalis

Binomial name
- Stenotothorax hibernalis (Nakane & Tsukamoto, 1956)

Synonyms
- Stenobronchus hibernalis Nakane & Tsukamoto, 1956; Stenobronchus hibernalis saghalinensis Nakane & Tsukamoto, 1956

Species of beetle

Stenotothorax hibernalis is a species of beetle of the family Scarabaeidae. It is found in Japan and the Russian Far East.

== Description ==
Adults reach a length of about 7.7–7.8 mm (0.30–0.31 in). They have a black or blackish-brown body, with the antennae and legs yellowish.

== Subspecies ==
- Stenotothorax hibernalis hibernalis (Japan, Russian Far East)
- Stenotothorax hibernalis saghalinensis (Nakane & Tsukamoto, 1956) (Russian Far East: Sakhalin)
