= Trichonotulus dzamosanicus =

Scientific classification
- Kingdom: Animalia
- Phylum: Arthropoda
- Clade: Pancrustacea
- Class: Insecta
- Order: Coleoptera
- Suborder: Polyphaga
- Infraorder: Scarabaeiformia
- Family: Scarabaeidae
- Genus: Trichonotulus
- Species: T. dzamosanicus

Binomial name
- Trichonotulus dzamosanicus (Stebnicka, 1973)

Synonyms
- Aphodius (Trichonotulus) dzamosanicus Stebnicka, 1973

Species of beetle

Trichonotulus dzamosanicus is a species of beetle of the family Scarabaeidae. It is found in North Korea.

== Description ==
Adults reach a length of about 4 mm (0.16 in). They have a deep brown, leathery body, covered with short, yellowish-brown setae.
