= Cephalocyclus potosinus =

Scientific classification
- Kingdom: Animalia
- Phylum: Arthropoda
- Clade: Pancrustacea
- Class: Insecta
- Order: Coleoptera
- Suborder: Polyphaga
- Infraorder: Scarabaeiformia
- Family: Scarabaeidae
- Genus: Cephalocyclus
- Species: C. potosinus

Binomial name
- Cephalocyclus potosinus Dellacasa, Dellacasa & Gordon, 2007

Species of beetle

Cephalocyclus potosinus is a species of beetle of the family Scarabaeidae. It is found in Mexico (Coahuila, Nuevo León).

== Description ==
Adults reach a length of about 5–6 mm (0.20–0.24 in). They have an oval-elongate, convex, moderately shiny, glabrous body. The head and pronotum are piceous, while the margin of the clypeus and the sides are vaguely reddish. The elytra are dark reddish-brown, the legs brown-reddish and the antennal club is dark brownish.

== Life history ==
Specimens have been found in cattle and horse dung.

== Etymology ==
The species is named after its type locality, Cerro Potosí (Nuevo Léon, Mexico).
