= Mendidius heikertingeri =

Scientific classification
- Kingdom: Animalia
- Phylum: Arthropoda
- Clade: Pancrustacea
- Class: Insecta
- Order: Coleoptera
- Suborder: Polyphaga
- Infraorder: Scarabaeiformia
- Family: Scarabaeidae
- Genus: Mendidius
- Species: M. heikertingeri

Binomial name
- Mendidius heikertingeri (Balthasar, 1938)

Synonyms
- Aphodius (Mendidius) heikertingeri Balthasar, 1938

Species of beetle

Mendidius heikertingeri is a species of beetle of the family Scarabaeidae. It is found in Turkmenistan and Iraq.

== Description ==
Adults reach a length of about 3.8 mm (0.15 in). They have a quite strongly convex, shiny, glabrous body. The head and the disc of the pronotum are dark brown, while the sides are reddish-yellow. The elytra and the legs are light yellowish-brown.
