= Cephalocyclus majomaensis =

Scientific classification
- Kingdom: Animalia
- Phylum: Arthropoda
- Clade: Pancrustacea
- Class: Insecta
- Order: Coleoptera
- Suborder: Polyphaga
- Infraorder: Scarabaeiformia
- Family: Scarabaeidae
- Genus: Cephalocyclus
- Species: C. majomaensis

Binomial name
- Cephalocyclus majomaensis Dellacasa, Dellacasa & Gordon, 2013

Species of beetle

Cephalocyclus majomaensis is a species of beetle of the family Scarabaeidae. It is found in Mexico (Zacatecas).

== Description ==
Adults reach a length of about 6.5–7 mm (0.26–0.28 in). They have an elongate, moderately convex, shiny, glabrous, testaceous body, with the head and pronotum somewhat darker than the elytra.

== Etymology ==
The species is named after the type locality, Majoma (Zacatecas, Mexico).
