= Tetraclipeoides denticulatus =

Scientific classification
- Kingdom: Animalia
- Phylum: Arthropoda
- Clade: Pancrustacea
- Class: Insecta
- Order: Coleoptera
- Suborder: Polyphaga
- Infraorder: Scarabaeiformia
- Family: Scarabaeidae
- Genus: Tetraclipeoides
- Species: T. denticulatus

Binomial name
- Tetraclipeoides denticulatus (Haldeman, 1848)

Synonyms
- Aphodius denticulatus Haldeman, 1848

Species of beetle

Tetraclipeoides denticulatus is a species of beetle of the family Scarabaeidae. It is found in the United States (California, Colorado, Idaho, Montana, Nevada, New Mexico, Oklahoma, Oregon, Utah, Washington, Wyoming) and Canada (Alberta).

== Description ==
Adults reach a length of about 5.5–7.5 mm (0.22–0.30 in). They have an oblong-oval, convex, shiny, nearly glabrous, piceous body, with part of the head, the scutellum and elytral suture paler. The underside, legs and antennae are ferrugineous.
