= Cephalocyclus luteolus =

- Dorsal view
- Lateral view

Scientific classification
- Kingdom: Animalia
- Phylum: Arthropoda
- Clade: Pancrustacea
- Class: Insecta
- Order: Coleoptera
- Suborder: Polyphaga
- Infraorder: Scarabaeiformia
- Family: Scarabaeidae
- Genus: Cephalocyclus
- Species: C. luteolus

Binomial name
- Cephalocyclus luteolus (Horn, 1887)

Synonyms
- Aphodius luteolus Horn, 1887

Species of beetle

Cephalocyclus luteolus is a species of beetle of the family Scarabaeidae. It is found in the United States (Arizona, New Mexico, Texas, Utah).

== Description ==
Adults reach a length of about 5–6 mm (0.20–0.24 in). They have a moderately elongate, sub-depressed, shiny, glabrous, yellowish-testaceous body. The head and pronotum are darker, the legs are testaceous and the antennal club is yellowish.
