= Planolinellus vittatus =

Scientific classification
- Kingdom: Animalia
- Phylum: Arthropoda
- Clade: Pancrustacea
- Class: Insecta
- Order: Coleoptera
- Suborder: Polyphaga
- Infraorder: Scarabaeiformia
- Family: Scarabaeidae
- Genus: Planolinellus
- Species: P. vittatus

Binomial name
- Planolinellus vittatus (Say, 1825)

Synonyms
- Aphodius vittatus Say, 1825; Planolinus vittatus; Aphodius (Agrilinus) tjanshanicus Balthasar, 1956; Aphodius (Agrilinus) mundus Reitter, 1892; Aphodius (Agrilinus) mundus vitiosus Reitter, 1892; Aphodius (Agrilinus) rufoplagiatus Reitter, 1892; Aphodius (Calamosternus) semiruber Motschulsky, 1860; Aphodius sellatus Mannerheim, 1852; Aphodius cruentatus Dejean, 1833

Species of beetle

Planolinellus vittatus is a widespread species of beetle of the family Scarabaeidae.

== Description ==
Adults reach a length of about 3–4.5 mm (0.12–0.18 in). They have an elongate, subcylindrical, moderately shiny, glabrous body. The elytra have a reddish spot at the shoulder and the legs are reddish-brown. The antennal club is piceous.

== Distribution ==
Nearctic: Canada (Alberta, British Columbia, Labrador, Manitoba, New Brunswick, Nova Scotia, Ontario, Quebec, Saskatchewan), United States (Colorado, Indiana, Iowa, Maryland, North Dakota, South Dakota). Palaearctic: Armenia, Bulgaria, China (Sichuan), Cyprus, Greece, Iran, Iraq, Japan, Kazakhstan, Kyrgyzstan, Mongolia, Romania, Syria, Russia (including Russian Far East and Siberia), Tajikistan, Turkey, Turkmenistan, Ukraine, Uzbekistan. Neotropical: Mexico (Baja California Sur, Chiapas, Chihuahua, Coahuila, Distrito Federal, Durango, Guanajuato, Guerrero, Hidalgo, Jalisco, México, Michoacán, Morelos, Nuevo León, Oaxaca, Puebla, Querétaro, San Luis Potosí, Sonora, Tabasco, Tlaxcala, Veracruz, Zacatecas).
