= Cephalocyclus howdenorum =

Scientific classification
- Kingdom: Animalia
- Phylum: Arthropoda
- Clade: Pancrustacea
- Class: Insecta
- Order: Coleoptera
- Suborder: Polyphaga
- Infraorder: Scarabaeiformia
- Family: Scarabaeidae
- Genus: Cephalocyclus
- Species: C. howdenorum

Binomial name
- Cephalocyclus howdenorum Dellacasa, Dellacasa & Gordon, 2007

Species of beetle

Cephalocyclus howdenorum is a species of beetle of the family Scarabaeidae. It is found in Mexico (Nuevo León).

== Description ==
Adults reach a length of about 7–8 mm (0.28–0.31 in). They have a broadly oval-elongate, strongly convex, shiny, glabrous, dark piceous body. The margin of the clypeus and sides of the pronotum are a bit paler and the elytra are dark brownish-yellow. The legs and antennal club are both brownish.

== Life history ==
Specimens have been found in cattle dung.

== Etymology ==
The species is named in honour of Henry and Anne Howden, who first collected the species.
