= Phaeaphodius rectus =

Scientific classification
- Kingdom: Animalia
- Phylum: Arthropoda
- Clade: Pancrustacea
- Class: Insecta
- Order: Coleoptera
- Suborder: Polyphaga
- Infraorder: Scarabaeiformia
- Family: Scarabaeidae
- Genus: Phaeaphodius
- Species: P. rectus

Binomial name
- Phaeaphodius rectus (Motschulsky, 1866)

Synonyms
- Calamosternus rectus Motschulsky, 1866; Aphodius (Pseudacrossus) tshuensis Protzenko, 1979; Aphodius (Phaeaphodius) edai Balthasar, 1956; Aphodius (Phaeaphodius) rectus agraphus Mader, 1953; Aphodius rectus balthasari Tesař, 1934; Aphodius rectus jurecekianus Tesař, 1934; Aphodius rectus proksi Tesař, 1934; Aphodius rectus rufoapicalis Tesař, 1934; Aphodius (Phaeaphodius) semicolor controversus Balthasar, 1932; Aphodius (Phaeaphodius) semicolor diabolicus Balthasar, 1932; Aphodius (Phaeaphodius) zichyi Csiki, 1901; Aphodius (Phaeaphodius) solskyi biformis Reitter, 1892; Aphodius (Phaeaphodius) solskyi semicolor Reitter, 1892; Aphodius castaneipennis Waterhouse, 1875; Aphodius diversus Waterhouse, 1875; Aphodius lividipennis Waterhouse, 1875; Aphodius solskyi Harold, 1871; Chilothorax vitta Motschulsky, 1866

Species of beetle

Phaeaphodius rectus is a species of beetle of the family Scarabaeidae. It is found in China (Beijing, Gansu, Heilongjiang, Hubei, Nei Mongol, Ningxia, Shaanxi, Shanxi, Sichuan, Xinjiang), Iran, Japan, Kazakhstan, Korea, Kyrgyzstan, Mongolia, the Russian Far East, Siberia, Taiwan, Turkmenistan, Uzbekistan and the United States (Oregon, Washington).

== Description ==
Adults reach a length of about 5–6 mm (0.20–0.24 in). They have an oblong, convex, shiny, glabrous, black body, sometimes with the elytra brown-yellowish with the suture and a lateral spot blackish, and in rare cases yellowish or even reddish.

== Life history ==
Specimens have been collected from cow and pig dung, carrion and dead animals, as well as from garbage piles.
