= Phaeaphodius dauricus =

Scientific classification
- Kingdom: Animalia
- Phylum: Arthropoda
- Clade: Pancrustacea
- Class: Insecta
- Order: Coleoptera
- Suborder: Polyphaga
- Infraorder: Scarabaeiformia
- Family: Scarabaeidae
- Genus: Phaeaphodius
- Species: P. dauricus

Binomial name
- Phaeaphodius dauricus (Harold, 1863)

Synonyms
- Aphodius dauricus Harold, 1863; Aphodius (Mendidius) margianus Semenov & Medvedev, 1928; Aphodius alleoni Orbigny, 1896; Aphodius (Phaeaphodius) truncatangulus Reitter, 1894; Aphodius (Phaeaphodius) acutangulus Reitter, 1892; Aphodius (Phaeaphodius) albociliatus Reitter, 1892; Aphodius (Melinopterus) semiluteus Reitter, 1887; Aphodius aeger Sharp, 1878

Species of beetle

Phaeaphodius dauricus is a species of beetle of the family Scarabaeidae. It is found in Afghanistan, Armenia, Azerbaijan, China (Nei Mongol, Xinjiang, Xizang), Kazakhstan, Kyrgyzstan, Mongolia, Russia (including the Russian Far East), Tajikistan, Turkey, Turkmenistan and Uzbekistan.

== Description ==
Adults reach a length of about 5–6 mm (0.20–0.24 in). They have a moderately convex, shiny, glabrous, black body. The elytra are typically dark chestnut-brown with a lighter apex, but may also be entirely black or yellowish-brown.
