= Cephalocyclus pullatus =

Scientific classification
- Kingdom: Animalia
- Phylum: Arthropoda
- Clade: Pancrustacea
- Class: Insecta
- Order: Coleoptera
- Suborder: Polyphaga
- Infraorder: Scarabaeiformia
- Family: Scarabaeidae
- Genus: Cephalocyclus
- Species: C. pullatus

Binomial name
- Cephalocyclus pullatus (Schmidt, 1914)

Synonyms
- Aphodius (Platydera) pullata Schmidt, 1914

Species of beetle

Cephalocyclus pullatus is a species of beetle of the family Scarabaeidae. It is found in Mexico (Durango, Sinaloa).

== Description ==
Adults reach a length of about 4.5–5 mm (0.18–0.20 in). They have a stout, oval, strongly convex body. The head, pronotum and scutellum are shiny, while the elytra are dull and have short hairs. They have a dark reddish-brown body, with the margin of the clypeus, sides of the pronotum and apex of the elytra reddish. The legs are reddish and the antennal club is piceous.
