= Phaeaphodius tauricola =

Scientific classification
- Kingdom: Animalia
- Phylum: Arthropoda
- Clade: Pancrustacea
- Class: Insecta
- Order: Coleoptera
- Suborder: Polyphaga
- Infraorder: Scarabaeiformia
- Family: Scarabaeidae
- Genus: Phaeaphodius
- Species: P. tauricola

Binomial name
- Phaeaphodius tauricola (Hrubant, 1961)

Synonyms
- Aphodius (Phaeaphodius) tauricola Hrubant, 1961

Species of beetle

Phaeaphodius tauricola is a species of beetle of the family Scarabaeidae. It is found in Turkey.

== Description ==
Adults reach a length of about 4.4–5 mm (0.17–0.20 in). They have an elongate-oval, quite strongly convex, black, shiny, glabrous body, with dark reddish-brown legs.
