= Aphodius elegans =

Scientific classification
- Kingdom: Animalia
- Phylum: Arthropoda
- Clade: Pancrustacea
- Class: Insecta
- Order: Coleoptera
- Suborder: Polyphaga
- Infraorder: Scarabaeiformia
- Family: Scarabaeidae
- Genus: Aphodius
- Species: A. elegans

Binomial name
- Aphodius elegans Allibert, 1847

Synonyms
- Aphodius elegans expletus Schmidt, 1909; Aphodius bisignatus Dehaan, 1843

Species of beetle

Aphodius elegans is a species of beetle of the family Scarabaeidae. It is found in Bhutan, China (Fujian, Gansu, Guangdong, Guizhou, Hubei, Jiangsu, Jiangxi, Ningxia, Qinghai, Shaanxi, Shandong, Shanghai, Shanxi, Sichuan, Xinjiang, Yunnan, Zhejiang), India (Arunachal Pradesh, Assam), Japan, Korea, the Russian Far East, Taiwan, Cambodia, Laos, Myanmar and Vietnam.

== Description ==
Adults reach a length of about 11–13 mm (0.43–0.51 in). They have a strongly convex, glossy, glabrous body. The head, pronotum and scutellum are black, while the elytra are light yellowish-brown to reddish-yellow, with a darkened suture and a black spot or band.

== Life history ==
Specimens have been collected from cow dung.
