= Cinacanthus penetrans =

Scientific classification
- Kingdom: Animalia
- Phylum: Arthropoda
- Clade: Pancrustacea
- Class: Insecta
- Order: Coleoptera
- Suborder: Polyphaga
- Infraorder: Scarabaeiformia
- Family: Scarabaeidae
- Genus: Cinacanthus
- Species: C. penetrans

Binomial name
- Cinacanthus penetrans (Schmidt, 1910)

Synonyms
- Aphodius penetrans Schmidt, 1910

Species of beetle

Cinacanthus penetrans is a species of beetle of the family Scarabaeidae. It is found in eastern Africa (it was described from Somaliland).

== Description ==
Adults reach a length of about 5 mm (0.20 in). They have a flatly convex, elongate, glossy, pale brownish-yellow body, with the back of the head, the disc of the pronotum, and the outermost sutural edge dark brown. The front of the head and the sides of the pronotum are reddish-yellow. The first interspace and the area around the tips of the elytra are also reddish. The sides of the thorax and the shoulders bear relatively long cilia.
