= Trichonotulus amdoensis =

Scientific classification
- Kingdom: Animalia
- Phylum: Arthropoda
- Clade: Pancrustacea
- Class: Insecta
- Order: Coleoptera
- Suborder: Polyphaga
- Infraorder: Scarabaeiformia
- Family: Scarabaeidae
- Genus: Trichonotulus
- Species: T. amdoensis

Binomial name
- Trichonotulus amdoensis Král, Rakovič & Mencl, 2015

Species of beetle

Trichonotulus amdoensis is a species of beetle of the family Scarabaeidae. It is found in China (Qinghai).

== Description ==
Adults reach a length of about 4.3–5.2 mm (0.17–0.20 in). They have an oblong-oval, moderately convex, reddish brown body. The head is glabrous and shining, while the pronotum and elytra are pubescent and opaque.

== Etymology ==
The species name is derived from Amdo, the name of one of three traditional regions of Tibet where the species was first collected.
