= Phaeaphodius costalis =

Scientific classification
- Kingdom: Animalia
- Phylum: Arthropoda
- Clade: Pancrustacea
- Class: Insecta
- Order: Coleoptera
- Suborder: Polyphaga
- Infraorder: Scarabaeiformia
- Family: Scarabaeidae
- Genus: Phaeaphodius
- Species: P. costalis

Binomial name
- Phaeaphodius costalis (Gebler, 1848)

Synonyms
- Aphodius costalis Gebler, 1848; Aphodius (Agolius) jakovlevi Koshantschikov, 1912; Aphodius sibiricus Harold, 1863

Species of beetle

Phaeaphodius costalis is a species of beetle of the family Scarabaeidae. It is found in Kazakhstan, Mongolia, Russia (including Siberia), Taiwan and Turkmenistan.

== Description ==
Adults reach a length of about 5–6 mm (0.20–0.24 in). The head, pronotum and scutellum are black and shining, while the elytra are yellowish-brown, with a darker longitudinal streak.
