= Mendidius laevicollis =

Scientific classification
- Kingdom: Animalia
- Phylum: Arthropoda
- Clade: Pancrustacea
- Class: Insecta
- Order: Coleoptera
- Suborder: Polyphaga
- Infraorder: Scarabaeiformia
- Family: Scarabaeidae
- Genus: Mendidius
- Species: M. laevicollis

Binomial name
- Mendidius laevicollis (Harold, 1866)

Synonyms
- Cnemargus laevicollis Harold, 1866

Species of beetle

Mendidius laevicollis is a species of beetle of the family Scarabaeidae. It is found in Algeria, Egypt, Syria, Mauretania and Somalia.

== Description ==
Adults reach a length of about 6–6.5 mm (0.24–0.26 in). They have a moderately convex, oblong-oval, shiny, glabrous, reddish-brown body. The pronotum is yellowish-red on the sides and the elytra are light reddish-yellow. The legs are yellowish-red.
