= Cephalocyclus iohannisgabrielis =

Scientific classification
- Kingdom: Animalia
- Phylum: Arthropoda
- Clade: Pancrustacea
- Class: Insecta
- Order: Coleoptera
- Suborder: Polyphaga
- Infraorder: Scarabaeiformia
- Family: Scarabaeidae
- Genus: Cephalocyclus
- Species: C. iohannisgabrielis

Binomial name
- Cephalocyclus iohannisgabrielis Dellacasa & Arriaga-Jiménez, 2020

Species of beetle

Cephalocyclus iohannisgabrielis is a species of beetle of the family Scarabaeidae. It is found in Mexico (Oaxaca).

== Description ==
Adults reach a length of about 7–9 mm (0.28–0.35 in). They have an elongate, moderately convex body, with the head and pronotum weakly shiny, but the elytra dull. The elytra have short hairs on preapical declivity and on the sides. Sexual Dimorphism in C. iohannisgabrielis makes the head of males more traverse, with more angular and with genae more protruding from the eyes, with metasternal plate being relatively flatter, whilst females have a narrower head, with less angulate genae and less protruding from the eyes.

== Life history ==
Specimens have been caught in pitfall traps baited with human excrement. C. iohannisgabrielis can be found during the second half of June to the end of August.

== Etymology ==
The species is named in honour of Giovanni Gabriele, the son of Marco Dellacasa, one of the authors.
