= Mendidius rutilinus =

Scientific classification
- Kingdom: Animalia
- Phylum: Arthropoda
- Clade: Pancrustacea
- Class: Insecta
- Order: Coleoptera
- Suborder: Polyphaga
- Infraorder: Scarabaeiformia
- Family: Scarabaeidae
- Genus: Mendidius
- Species: M. rutilinus

Binomial name
- Mendidius rutilinus (Reitter, 1892)

Synonyms
- Aphodius (Mendidius) rutilinus Reitter, 1892

Species of beetle

Mendidius rutilinus is a species of beetle of the family Scarabaeidae. It is found in Algeria.

== Description ==
Adults reach a length of about 3.8–5 mm (0.15–0.20 in). They have a strongly convex, shiny, glabrous, reddish-brown body, with the sides of the pronotum and the elytra light brown. The sutural margin is darkened.
