= Mendidius sijazovi =

Scientific classification
- Kingdom: Animalia
- Phylum: Arthropoda
- Clade: Pancrustacea
- Class: Insecta
- Order: Coleoptera
- Suborder: Polyphaga
- Infraorder: Scarabaeiformia
- Family: Scarabaeidae
- Genus: Mendidius
- Species: M. sijazovi

Binomial name
- Mendidius sijazovi (Lebedev, 1932)

Synonyms
- Aphodius (Mendidius) sijazovi Lebedev, 1932

Species of beetle

Mendidius sijazovi is a species of beetle of the family Scarabaeidae. It is found in Kazakhstan and Uzbekistan.

== Description ==
Adults reach a length of about 3.5–4.5 mm (0.14–0.18 in). The head and pronotum are pitch-black and iridescent, with the sides of the head and of the pronotum reddish. The elytra are light yellow with brown interstices along the lateral margin. The legs are light reddish-brown.
