= Cephalocyclus moroni =

Scientific classification
- Kingdom: Animalia
- Phylum: Arthropoda
- Clade: Pancrustacea
- Class: Insecta
- Order: Coleoptera
- Suborder: Polyphaga
- Infraorder: Scarabaeiformia
- Family: Scarabaeidae
- Genus: Cephalocyclus
- Species: C. moroni

Binomial name
- Cephalocyclus moroni Minor, Dellacasa & Dellacasa, 2015

Species of beetle

Cephalocyclus moroni is a species of beetle of the family Scarabaeidae. It is found in Mexico (Jalisco).

== Description ==
Adults reach a length of about 7–8 mm (0.28–0.31 in). They have an oval-elongate, moderately convex, shiny, dark brown body. The margin of the clypeus and the sides of the pronotum are red, the antennal club is brown and the legs are dark brown.

== Etymology ==
The species is named in honour of Dr. Miguel Angel Morón.
