= Eupleurus antiquus =

Scientific classification
- Kingdom: Animalia
- Phylum: Arthropoda
- Clade: Pancrustacea
- Class: Insecta
- Order: Coleoptera
- Suborder: Polyphaga
- Infraorder: Scarabaeiformia
- Family: Scarabaeidae
- Genus: Eupleurus
- Species: E. antiquus

Binomial name
- Eupleurus antiquus (Faldermann, 1835)

Synonyms
- Aphodius antiquus Faldermann, 1835

Species of beetle

Eupleurus antiquus is a species of beetle of the family Scarabaeidae. It is found in China (Jilin, Nei Mongol), Mongolia, the Russian Far East and Siberia.

== Description ==
Adults reach a length of about 6–8 mm (0.24–0.31 in). They have a black body, with the elytra often dark brown towards the apex. The head and pronotum are shiny, while there is very fine pubescence at the apex of the elytra.
