= Cephalocyclus rockefelleri =

Scientific classification
- Kingdom: Animalia
- Phylum: Arthropoda
- Clade: Pancrustacea
- Class: Insecta
- Order: Coleoptera
- Suborder: Polyphaga
- Infraorder: Scarabaeiformia
- Family: Scarabaeidae
- Genus: Cephalocyclus
- Species: C. rockefelleri

Binomial name
- Cephalocyclus rockefelleri Dellacasa, Dellacasa & Gordon, 2007

Species of beetle

Cephalocyclus rockefelleri is a species of beetle of the family Scarabaeidae. It is found in Mexico (Chihuahua).

== Description ==
Adults reach a length of about 4.5–6 mm (0.18–0.24 in). They have an oblong, moderately convex, shiny, glabrous, reddish-brown body, with the margin of the clypeus and sides of the pronotum paler. The legs are brownish and the antennal club is dark brown.

== Etymology ==
The species is named in honour of David Rockefeller.
