= Mendidius abdurakhmanovi =

Scientific classification
- Kingdom: Animalia
- Phylum: Arthropoda
- Clade: Pancrustacea
- Class: Insecta
- Order: Coleoptera
- Suborder: Polyphaga
- Infraorder: Scarabaeiformia
- Family: Scarabaeidae
- Genus: Mendidius
- Species: M. abdurakhmanovi

Binomial name
- Mendidius abdurakhmanovi Shokhin, 2018

Species of beetle

Mendidius abdurakhmanovi is a species of beetle of the family Scarabaeidae. It is found in Azerbaijan.

== Description ==
Adults reach a length of about 4.5–6 mm (0.18–0.24 in). They have a brown head and the pronotum is also brown, both with lighter lateral margins. The sides of the pronotum bear short hairs. The elytra are yellow, with the sutural interval entirely darkened.

== Etymology ==
The species is named in honour of Prof. Gayirbeg M. Abdurakhmanov.
