= Pseudagolius coloradensis =

Scientific classification
- Kingdom: Animalia
- Phylum: Arthropoda
- Clade: Pancrustacea
- Class: Insecta
- Order: Coleoptera
- Suborder: Polyphaga
- Infraorder: Scarabaeiformia
- Family: Scarabaeidae
- Genus: Pseudagolius
- Species: P. coloradensis

Binomial name
- Pseudagolius coloradensis (Horn, 1870)

Synonyms
- Aphodius coloradensis Horn, 1870; Aphodius flohri Bates, 1887

Species of beetle

Pseudagolius coloradensis is a species of beetle of the family Scarabaeidae. It is found in Canada (Alberta, Manitoba, Saskatchewan), the United States (Arizona, Colorado, Iowa, New Mexico, North Dakota, South Dakota) and Mexico (Chihuahua, Coahuila, Distrito Federal, Durango, Guanajuato, Hidalgo, Jalisco, México, Michoacán, Nayarit, Oaxaca, Puebla, Querétaro, San Luis Potosí, Tlaxcala, Veracruz, Zacatecas).

== Description ==
Adults reach a length of about 6–7.5 mm (0.24–0.30 in). They have a convex, strongly shiny, glabrous, piceous-brownish body, with the antennae reddish-testaceous.
