= Aphodius calichromus =

Scientific classification
- Kingdom: Animalia
- Phylum: Arthropoda
- Clade: Pancrustacea
- Class: Insecta
- Order: Coleoptera
- Suborder: Polyphaga
- Infraorder: Scarabaeiformia
- Family: Scarabaeidae
- Genus: Aphodius
- Species: A. calichromus

Binomial name
- Aphodius calichromus Balthasar, 1932

Species of beetle

Aphodius calichromus is a species of beetle of the family Scarabaeidae. It is found in China (Fujian, Guangdong, Sichuan, Yunnan).

== Description ==
Adults reach a length of about 6–8 mm (0.24–0.31 in). They have a strongly convex, shiny, glabrous, black body, with the elytra yellowish-brown to reddish-brown, with a darkened suture. The legs are dark brown.
