= Colobopterus propraetor =

Scientific classification
- Kingdom: Animalia
- Phylum: Arthropoda
- Clade: Pancrustacea
- Class: Insecta
- Order: Coleoptera
- Suborder: Polyphaga
- Infraorder: Scarabaeiformia
- Family: Scarabaeidae
- Genus: Colobopterus
- Species: C. propraetor

Binomial name
- Colobopterus propraetor (Balthasar, 1932)

Synonyms
- Aphodius (Colobopterus) haroldianus propraetor Balthasar, 1932; Aphodius (Colobopterus) propraetor solisortus Dellacasa, 1986

Species of beetle

Colobopterus propraetor is a species of beetle of the family Scarabaeidae. It is found in China (Heilongjiang), Korea, Mongolia, the Russian Far East and Siberia.

== Description ==
Adults reach a length of about 8.5–12.5 mm (0.33–0.49 in). They have a shiny, black body, with the elytra dark brown to blackish-brown.

== Life history ==
Specimens have been collected in cow and horse dung.
