= Trichaphodioides calcaratus =

Scientific classification
- Kingdom: Animalia
- Phylum: Arthropoda
- Clade: Pancrustacea
- Class: Insecta
- Order: Coleoptera
- Suborder: Polyphaga
- Infraorder: Scarabaeiformia
- Family: Scarabaeidae
- Genus: Trichaphodioides
- Species: T. calcaratus

Binomial name
- Trichaphodioides calcaratus (Boheman, 1857)

Synonyms
- Aphodius calcaratus Boheman, 1857; Aphodius (Trichaphodius) calcaratus albicans Endrödi, 1960; Aphodius (Trichaphodius) calcaratus convexior Endrödi, 1960; Aphodius (Trichaphodius) calcaratus nero Endrödi, 1960

Species of beetle

Trichaphodioides calcaratus is a species of beetle of the family Scarabaeidae. It is found in Botswana, Ethiopia, Ghana, Kenya, the Democratic Republic of the Congo, South Africa, Rwanda, Somalia and Sudan.

== Description ==
Adults reach a length of about 4–5 mm (0.16–0.20 in). They have an oval-elongate, moderately shiny, convex body. The head and pronotum are glabrous, while the elytra are laterally and apically pubescent. The head and pronotum are dark brown, with the clypeus and lateral margins of the latter yellowish. The elytra are brown-yellow with a brown preapical spot.
