= Neotrichonotulus inurbanus =

Scientific classification
- Kingdom: Animalia
- Phylum: Arthropoda
- Clade: Pancrustacea
- Class: Insecta
- Order: Coleoptera
- Suborder: Polyphaga
- Infraorder: Scarabaeiformia
- Family: Scarabaeidae
- Genus: Neotrichonotulus
- Species: N. inurbanus

Binomial name
- Neotrichonotulus inurbanus (Gordon & Howden, 1973)

Synonyms
- Aphodius inurbanus Gordon & Howden, 1973

Species of beetle

Neotrichonotulus inurbanus is a species of beetle of the family Scarabaeidae. It is found in Mexico (Durango) and the United States (Arizona).

== Description ==
Adults reach a length of about 3.5–4 mm (0.14–0.16 in). They have an elongate, subcylindrical, strongly convex body. The head is somewhat shiny, the pronotum is dull and the elytra have shiny striae. The head is glabrous, while the pronotum and elytra have short pale setae. They are blackish, with the margin of the clypeus, anterior angles of the pronotum and apex of the elytra dark reddish-brown. The legs are brownish and the antennal club is piceous.
