= Mendidius bivittatus =

Scientific classification
- Kingdom: Animalia
- Phylum: Arthropoda
- Clade: Pancrustacea
- Class: Insecta
- Order: Coleoptera
- Suborder: Polyphaga
- Infraorder: Scarabaeiformia
- Family: Scarabaeidae
- Genus: Mendidius
- Species: M. bivittatus

Binomial name
- Mendidius bivittatus Schmidt, 1922

Synonyms
- Aphodius (Mendidius) vlacili Tesař, 1945

Species of beetle

Mendidius bivittatus is a species of beetle of the family Scarabaeidae. It is found in China (Hebei, Heilongjiang, Jilin, Liaoning, Tianjin).

== Description ==
Adults reach a length of about 5–6 mm (0.20–0.24 in). They have a strongly convex, rather shiny body. The head, pronotum and scutellum are dark brown to blackish-brown, with the anterior margin of the head reddish and the sides of the pronotum yellowish-red. The elytra are light yellowish-brown, with the sutural interval, the lateral intervals, and the apical margin brown.
