= Hornosus larreae =

Scientific classification
- Kingdom: Animalia
- Phylum: Arthropoda
- Clade: Pancrustacea
- Class: Insecta
- Order: Coleoptera
- Suborder: Polyphaga
- Infraorder: Scarabaeiformia
- Family: Scarabaeidae
- Genus: Hornosus
- Species: H. larreae

Binomial name
- Hornosus larreae (Horn, 1887)

Synonyms
- Aphodius larreae Horn, 1887; Aphodius bifrons Bates, 1887

Species of beetle

Hornosus larreae is a species of beetle of the family Scarabaeidae. It is found in Mexico (Chihuahua, Coahuila) and the United States (Arizona, New Mexico, Texas).

== Description ==
Adults reach a length of about 4–5 mm (0.16–0.20 in). They have an oblong, moderately convex, alutaceous, mostly glabrous, yellowish body. The pronotum often has a brownish spot at the middle of each side and the elytral suture is darkened.
