= Aphodius irregularis =

Scientific classification
- Kingdom: Animalia
- Phylum: Arthropoda
- Clade: Pancrustacea
- Class: Insecta
- Order: Coleoptera
- Suborder: Polyphaga
- Infraorder: Scarabaeiformia
- Family: Scarabaeidae
- Genus: Aphodius
- Species: A. irregularis

Binomial name
- Aphodius irregularis Westwood, 1839

Synonyms
- Aphodius (Agrilinus) krupkai Tesař, 1969

Species of beetle

Aphodius irregularis is a species of beetle of the family Scarabaeidae. It is found in China (Xizang), India (Arunachal Pradesh, Himachal Pradesh, Jammu & Kashmir, Sikkim, Uttarakhand, Uttar Pradesh), Nepal and Pakistan.

== Description ==
Adults reach a length of about 5–6 mm (0.20–0.24 in). They have a quite strongly convex, shiny, glabrous, black body, with the anterior angles of the pronotum yellow. The elytra are light yellowish-brown with a black transverse band, a black spot on the shoulders and an oval spot anterior to the apex. The legs are blackish-brown.
