= Oscarinus cabreroi =

Scientific classification
- Kingdom: Animalia
- Phylum: Arthropoda
- Clade: Pancrustacea
- Class: Insecta
- Order: Coleoptera
- Suborder: Polyphaga
- Infraorder: Scarabaeiformia
- Family: Scarabaeidae
- Genus: Oscarinus
- Species: O. cabreroi

Binomial name
- Oscarinus cabreroi Dellacasa, Dellacasa & Gordon, 2013

Species of beetle

Oscarinus cabreroi is a species of beetle of the family Scarabaeidae. It is found in Mexico (Chihuahua, Nuevo León, San Luis Potosí, Sinaloa).

== Description ==
Adults reach a length of about 4–4.5 mm (0.16–0.18 in). They have a shortly oval, strongly convex, shiny, almost glabrous, blackish body. The margin of the clypeus, anterior angles of the pronotum and the base and preapical declivity of the elytra are brownish-red. The legs are brownish and the antennal club is piceous.

== Life history ==
Specimens have been found in cow dung.

== Etymology ==
The species is named in honour of Francisco J. Cabrero-Sañudo.
