= Colobopterus quadratus =

Scientific classification
- Kingdom: Animalia
- Phylum: Arthropoda
- Clade: Pancrustacea
- Class: Insecta
- Order: Coleoptera
- Suborder: Polyphaga
- Infraorder: Scarabaeiformia
- Family: Scarabaeidae
- Genus: Colobopterus
- Species: C. quadratus

Binomial name
- Colobopterus quadratus (Reiche, 1847)

Synonyms
- Aphodius (Colobopterus) quadratus Reiche, 1850; Aphodius (Colobopterus) haroldianus tesari Všetečka, 1939; Aphodius (Colobopterus) haroldianus Balthasar, 1932; Aphodius apicalis Harold, 1861

Species of beetle

Colobopterus quadratus is a species of beetle of the family Scarabaeidae. It is found in China (Ningxia), Japan, Korea and the Russian Far East.
