= Cephalocyclus cartagoensis =

Scientific classification
- Kingdom: Animalia
- Phylum: Arthropoda
- Clade: Pancrustacea
- Class: Insecta
- Order: Coleoptera
- Suborder: Polyphaga
- Infraorder: Scarabaeiformia
- Family: Scarabaeidae
- Genus: Cephalocyclus
- Species: C. cartagoensis

Binomial name
- Cephalocyclus cartagoensis Dellacasa, Dellacasa & Gordon, 2007

Species of beetle

Cephalocyclus cartagoensis is a species of beetle of the family Scarabaeidae. It is found in Costa Rica.

== Description ==
Adults reach a length of about 7–8 mm (0.28–0.31 in). They have an elongate, convex, moderately shiny, pale brownish body, with the disc of the pronotum and elytral suture dark brown and the antennal club dark testaceous.
