= Trichaphodioides manifestus =

Scientific classification
- Kingdom: Animalia
- Phylum: Arthropoda
- Clade: Pancrustacea
- Class: Insecta
- Order: Coleoptera
- Suborder: Polyphaga
- Infraorder: Scarabaeiformia
- Family: Scarabaeidae
- Genus: Trichaphodioides
- Species: T. manifestus

Binomial name
- Trichaphodioides manifestus (Schmidt, 1910)

Synonyms
- Aphodius manifestus Schmidt, 1910

Species of beetle

Trichaphodioides manifestus is a species of beetle of the family Scarabaeidae. It is found in Ghana, Ivory Coast and South Africa (KwaZulu-Natal).

== Description ==
Adults reach a length of about 4.5 mm (0.18 in). They have an oblong, slightly convex, yellowish-brown body, with the back of the head and the disc of the pronotum darker. The elytra are hairy.
