= Cinacanthus militaris =

Scientific classification
- Kingdom: Animalia
- Phylum: Arthropoda
- Clade: Pancrustacea
- Class: Insecta
- Order: Coleoptera
- Suborder: Polyphaga
- Infraorder: Scarabaeiformia
- Family: Scarabaeidae
- Genus: Cinacanthus
- Species: C. militaris

Binomial name
- Cinacanthus militaris (LeConte, 1858)

Synonyms
- Aphodius militaris LeConte, 1858

Species of beetle

Cinacanthus militaris is a species of beetle of the family Scarabaeidae. It is found in the United States (California, Nevada, Oregon) and Mexico (Baja California).

== Description ==
Adults reach a length of about 6–7 mm (0.24–0.28 in). They have an oblong, moderately convex, feebly shiny, nearly glabrous, dark chestnut-brown body.
