= Trichonotulus castetsi =

Scientific classification
- Kingdom: Animalia
- Phylum: Arthropoda
- Clade: Pancrustacea
- Class: Insecta
- Order: Coleoptera
- Suborder: Polyphaga
- Infraorder: Scarabaeiformia
- Family: Scarabaeidae
- Genus: Trichonotulus
- Species: T. castetsi

Binomial name
- Trichonotulus castetsi (Paulian, 1936)

Synonyms
- Aphodius (Trichonotulus) castetsi Paulian, 1936; Aphodius (Paradidactylia) echinatus Petrovitz, 1961

Species of beetle

Trichonotulus castetsi is a species of beetle of the family Scarabaeidae. It is found in India (Kerala) and Nepal.

== Description ==
Adults reach a length of about 2.5–3.3 mm (0.098–0.130 in). They have an elongate, fairly parallel-sided, brown body. They are covered with short, stiff, yellow setae. The anterior margin of the head and the lateral margins of the pronotum are yellowish-brown.
