= Aphodius corallifer =

Scientific classification
- Kingdom: Animalia
- Phylum: Arthropoda
- Clade: Pancrustacea
- Class: Insecta
- Order: Coleoptera
- Suborder: Polyphaga
- Infraorder: Scarabaeiformia
- Family: Scarabaeidae
- Genus: Aphodius
- Species: A. corallifer

Binomial name
- Aphodius corallifer Koshantschikov, 1913

Species of beetle

Aphodius corallifer is a species of beetle of the family Scarabaeidae. It is found in China (Zhejiang).

== Description ==
Adults reach a length of about 10 mm (0.39 in). They have a fairly strongly convex, shiny, glabrous body. The head and pronotum are black, while the elytra are bright coral-red.
