= Trichonotulus vultuosus =

Scientific classification
- Kingdom: Animalia
- Phylum: Arthropoda
- Clade: Pancrustacea
- Class: Insecta
- Order: Coleoptera
- Suborder: Polyphaga
- Infraorder: Scarabaeiformia
- Family: Scarabaeidae
- Genus: Trichonotulus
- Species: T. vultuosus

Binomial name
- Trichonotulus vultuosus (Balthasar, 1971)

Synonyms
- Aphodius (Trichaphodius) vultuosus Balthasar, 1971

Species of beetle

Trichonotulus vultuosus is a species of beetle of the family Scarabaeidae. It is found in India, Nepal and Pakistan.

== Description ==
Adults reach a length of about 4.8–5 mm (0.19–0.20 in). They have a moderately convex, alutaceous, yellowish-brown body, with a black scutellum. The posterior of the head and the disc of the pronotum are somewhat darkened. The dorsal surface has yellow setae.
