= Cephalocyclus bordati =

Scientific classification
- Kingdom: Animalia
- Phylum: Arthropoda
- Clade: Pancrustacea
- Class: Insecta
- Order: Coleoptera
- Suborder: Polyphaga
- Infraorder: Scarabaeiformia
- Family: Scarabaeidae
- Genus: Cephalocyclus
- Species: C. bordati

Binomial name
- Cephalocyclus bordati Dellacasa, Dellacasa & Gordon, 2007

Species of beetle

Cephalocyclus bordati is a species of beetle of the family Scarabaeidae. It is found in Mexico (Chihuahua, Durango).

== Description ==
Adults reach a length of about 5–6 mm (0.20–0.24 in). They have an elongate, convex, shiny, glabrous body. The head and pronotum are dark brownish, with the sides of the pronotum, as well as the elytra testaceous. The legs are brown-testaceous and the antennal club is yellowish.

== Etymology ==
The species is named in honour of Afrotropical Aphodiinae specialist Patrice Bordat.
