= Aphodius swaneticus =

Scientific classification
- Kingdom: Animalia
- Phylum: Arthropoda
- Clade: Pancrustacea
- Class: Insecta
- Order: Coleoptera
- Suborder: Polyphaga
- Infraorder: Scarabaeiformia
- Family: Scarabaeidae
- Genus: Aphodius
- Species: A. swaneticus

Binomial name
- Aphodius swaneticus Reitter, 1892

Species of beetle

Aphodius swaneticus is a species of beetle of the family Scarabaeidae. It is found in Georgia and Russia.

== Description ==
Adults reach a length of about 6 mm (0.24 in). They have a strongly convex, shiny, glabrous, black body.
