= Colobopterus erraticus =

Scientific classification
- Kingdom: Animalia
- Phylum: Arthropoda
- Clade: Pancrustacea
- Class: Insecta
- Order: Coleoptera
- Suborder: Polyphaga
- Infraorder: Scarabaeiformia
- Family: Scarabaeidae
- Genus: Colobopterus
- Species: C. erraticus

Binomial name
- Colobopterus erraticus (Linnaeus, 1758)

Synonyms
- Scarabaeus erraticus Linnaeus, 1758; Aphodius (Colobopterus) erraticus rufipes Aliquo, 1970; Aphodius erraticus korbeli Roubal, 1935; Aphodius (Colobopterus) erraticus zighanica Eichler, 1924; Aphodius (Colobopterus) erraticus limitinus Schmidt, 1922; Aphodius erraticus taeniatus Schilsky, 1888; Aphodius (Colobopterus) erraticus bistrigatus Dalla Torre, 1879; Aphodius (Colobopterus) erraticus lineatus Dalla Torre, 1879; Aphodius (Colobopterus) erraticus melancholicus Dalla Torre, 1879; Aphodius (Colobopterus) erraticus nebulosus Dalla Torre, 1879; Aphodius (Colobopterus) erraticus unicolor Dalla Torre, 1879; Aphodius caprarum Gistel, 1857; Aphodius pensvallensis Melsheimer, 1845; Aphodius gonagricus Fischer von Waldheim, 1844; Colobopterus erraticus fumigatus Mulsant, 1842; Colobopterus erraticus nebulosus Mulsant, 1842; Colobopterus erraticus submaculatus Mulsant, 1842; Aphodius striolatus Gebler, 1832

Species of beetle

Colobopterus erraticus is a species of beetle of the family Scarabaeidae. It has a Holarctic distribution.

== Description ==
Adults reach a length of about 5–7 mm (0.20–0.28 in). They have a short, subparallel-sided, glabrous body. The head and pronotum are moderately shiny and the elytra are subopaque. The head, pronotum and scutellum are black and the elytra are yellowish with brownish suture, and sometimes with a cloudy spot or long blackish strips.

== Distribution ==
Palaearctic: Afghanistan, Albania, Algeria, Armenia, Austria, Azerbaijan, Belarus, Belgium, Bosnia Herzegovina, Bulgaria, China (Ningxia, Xizang), Croatia, Czech Republic, Cyprus, Denmark, Estonia, Finland, France, Georgia, Germany, Great Britain, Greece, Hungary, Ireland, Iran, Iraq, Israel, Italy, Jordan, Kazakhstan, Kyrgyzstan, Latvia, Lebanon, Lithuania, Macedonia, Mongolia, Montenegro, Morocco, the Netherlands, Norway, Pakistan, Poland, Portugal, Romania, Russia (including Russian Far East, Siberia), Serbia, Slovakia, Slovenia, Spain, Sweden, Switzerland, Syria, Tajikistan, Tunisia, Turkey, Turkmenistan, Ukraine, Uzbekistan. Nearctic: Canada (Alberta, Manitoba, New Brunswick, Newfoundland, Nova Scotia, Ontario, Quebec, Saskatchewan), United States (Colorado, Georgia, Iowa, Maryland, Missouri, Montana, Nebraska, North Dakota, Wisconsin).
