= Aphodius fasciger =

Scientific classification
- Kingdom: Animalia
- Phylum: Arthropoda
- Clade: Pancrustacea
- Class: Insecta
- Order: Coleoptera
- Suborder: Polyphaga
- Infraorder: Scarabaeiformia
- Family: Scarabaeidae
- Genus: Aphodius
- Species: A. fasciger

Binomial name
- Aphodius fasciger Harold, 1881

Synonyms
- Aphodius schenklingi Schmidt, 1907; Aphodius schenklingi infestus Schmidt, 1907; Aphodius schenklingi sexsignatus Schmidt, 1907

Species of beetle

Aphodius fasciger is a species of beetle of the family Scarabaeidae. It is found in Bhutan, China (Guizhou, Shandong, Sichuan, Xizang, Yunnan), India (Sikkim, West Bengal), Nepal and Vietnam.

== Description ==
Adults reach a length of about 5–6.5 mm (0.20–0.26 in). They have a quite strongly convex, shiny, glabrous, black body, with the anterior angles of the pronotum yellowish-brown. The elytra are light yellowish-brown with a black transverse band. The legs are blackish-brown.
