= Mendidius fimbriolatus =

Scientific classification
- Kingdom: Animalia
- Phylum: Arthropoda
- Clade: Pancrustacea
- Class: Insecta
- Order: Coleoptera
- Suborder: Polyphaga
- Infraorder: Scarabaeiformia
- Family: Scarabaeidae
- Genus: Mendidius
- Species: M. fimbriolatus

Binomial name
- Mendidius fimbriolatus (Mannerheim, 1849)

Synonyms
- Aphodius fimbriolatus Mannerheim, 1849; Aphodius (Mendidius) bidentellus Schmidt, 1910

Species of beetle

Mendidius fimbriolatus is a species of beetle of the family Scarabaeidae. It is found in Mongolia, the Russian Far East and Siberia.

== Description ==
Adults reach a length of about 5 mm (0.20 in). They have a moderately elongate, convex, shiny, rather glabrous, piceous body, with the elytra testaceous with brownish suture. The legs and antennae are brownish, the latter with a darker club.
