= Mendidius curtulus =

Scientific classification
- Kingdom: Animalia
- Phylum: Arthropoda
- Clade: Pancrustacea
- Class: Insecta
- Order: Coleoptera
- Suborder: Polyphaga
- Infraorder: Scarabaeiformia
- Family: Scarabaeidae
- Genus: Mendidius
- Species: M. curtulus

Binomial name
- Mendidius curtulus (Harold, 1866)

Synonyms
- Cnemargus curtulus Harold, 1866

Species of beetle

Mendidius curtulus is a species of beetle of the family Scarabaeidae. It is found in Russia and Ukraine.

== Description ==
Adults reach a length of about 4 mm (0.16 in). They have a quite strongly convex, shining, yellow-red body, with the back of the head and the disc of the pronotum darker brown. The sutural margin of the elytra is darkened.
