= Cephalocyclus costaricensis =

Scientific classification
- Kingdom: Animalia
- Phylum: Arthropoda
- Clade: Pancrustacea
- Class: Insecta
- Order: Coleoptera
- Suborder: Polyphaga
- Infraorder: Scarabaeiformia
- Family: Scarabaeidae
- Genus: Cephalocyclus
- Species: C. costaricensis

Binomial name
- Cephalocyclus costaricensis Dellacasa, Dellacasa & Gordon, 2007

Species of beetle

Cephalocyclus costaricensis is a species of beetle of the family Scarabaeidae. It is found in Costa Rica.

== Description ==
Adults reach a length of about 6–7 mm (0.24–0.28 in). They have an oblong, moderately convex, very shiny, glabrous, brown-reddish body, with the disc of the pronotum and elytral suture darker. The antennal club is testaceous.

== Etymology ==
The species is named after its type locality.
