= Mendidius diffidens =

Scientific classification
- Kingdom: Animalia
- Phylum: Arthropoda
- Clade: Pancrustacea
- Class: Insecta
- Order: Coleoptera
- Suborder: Polyphaga
- Infraorder: Scarabaeiformia
- Family: Scarabaeidae
- Genus: Mendidius
- Species: M. diffidens

Binomial name
- Mendidius diffidens (Reitter, 1892)

Synonyms
- Aphodius (Mendidius) diffidens Reitter, 1892

Species of beetle

Mendidius diffidens is a species of beetle of the family Scarabaeidae. It is found in Armenia, Iraq and Turkmenistan.

== Description ==
Adults reach a length of about 3.5–4 mm (0.14–0.16 in). They have a strongly convex, nearly parallel-sided, shiny, glabrous, blackish-brown body, with the sides of the head and pronotum light reddish-brown. The scutellum is blackish-brown and the elytra are light yellowish-brown, with the suture darkened. The legs are reddish.
