= Colobopterus indagator =

Scientific classification
- Kingdom: Animalia
- Phylum: Arthropoda
- Clade: Pancrustacea
- Class: Insecta
- Order: Coleoptera
- Suborder: Polyphaga
- Infraorder: Scarabaeiformia
- Family: Scarabaeidae
- Genus: Colobopterus
- Species: C. indagator

Binomial name
- Colobopterus indagator (Mannerheim, 1849)

Synonyms
- Aphodius indagator Mannerheim, 1849

Species of beetle

Colobopterus indagator is a species of beetle of the family Scarabaeidae. It is found in China (Shaanxi), Japan, Korea, the Russian Far East and Siberia.

== Description ==
Adults reach a length of about 10–12.5 mm (0.39–0.49 in). They have a rather flat, almost parallel-sided body. The dorsal surface is glabrous and dull or nearly dull and black. The elytra are often blackish-brown and reddish-translucent toward the rear, or sometimes entirely yellowish-brown with a dark suture.

== Life history ==
Specimens have been collected in cow dung.
