= Planolinellus rufoanalis =

Scientific classification
- Kingdom: Animalia
- Phylum: Arthropoda
- Clade: Pancrustacea
- Class: Insecta
- Order: Coleoptera
- Suborder: Polyphaga
- Infraorder: Scarabaeiformia
- Family: Scarabaeidae
- Genus: Planolinellus
- Species: P. rufoanalis

Binomial name
- Planolinellus rufoanalis (Petrovitz, 1961)

Synonyms
- Aphodius (Agrilinus) rufoanalis Petrovitz, 1961

Species of beetle

Planolinellus rufoanalis is a species of beetle of the family Scarabaeidae. It is found in India (Jammu & Kashmir, Karakorum) and Pakistan.

== Description ==
Adults reach a length of about 2.9–3.1 mm (0.11–0.12 in). They have an entirely black body, although the apex of elytra is sometimes reddish-brown.
