= Mendidius multiplex =

Scientific classification
- Kingdom: Animalia
- Phylum: Arthropoda
- Clade: Pancrustacea
- Class: Insecta
- Order: Coleoptera
- Suborder: Polyphaga
- Infraorder: Scarabaeiformia
- Family: Scarabaeidae
- Genus: Mendidius
- Species: M. multiplex

Binomial name
- Mendidius multiplex (Reitter, 1897)

Synonyms
- Aphodius (Mendidius) multiplex Reitter, 1897; Aphodius (Mendidius) breviciliatus Poppius, 1904; Aphodius (Mendidius) reitterianus Heyden, 1896; Aphodius (Mendidius) reitteri Fairmaire, 1894; Aphodius granulifrons Reitter, 1887

Species of beetle

Mendidius multiplex is a species of beetle of the family Scarabaeidae. It is found in Afghanistan, Armenia, China (Xinjiang), Kazakhstan, Kyrgyzstan, Mongolia, Russia, Tajikistan, Turkmenistan and Uzbekistan.

== Description ==
Adults reach a length of about 3.5–5.5 mm (0.14–0.22 in). They have a strongly convex, shiny, glabrous body. The head, pronotum and scutellum are dark brown to blackish-brown, with the anterior margin of the head reddish and the sides of the pronotum edged with yellow. The elytra are light yellowish-brown, with the sutural interval reddish-brown. The legs are yellowish-red.
