= Mendidius willbergi =

Scientific classification
- Kingdom: Animalia
- Phylum: Arthropoda
- Clade: Pancrustacea
- Class: Insecta
- Order: Coleoptera
- Suborder: Polyphaga
- Infraorder: Scarabaeiformia
- Family: Scarabaeidae
- Genus: Mendidius
- Species: M. willbergi

Binomial name
- Mendidius willbergi Reitter, 1891

Synonyms
- Aphodius (Mendidius) willbergi

Species of beetle

Mendidius willbergi is a species of beetle of the family Scarabaeidae. It is found in Uzbekistan.

== Description ==
Adults reach a length of about 8–8.5 mm (0.31–0.33 in). They have an elongate, shiny, glabrous, reddish-brown body, with the sides of the pronotum yellowish. The scutellum has a dark border and the elytra are yellowish-brown with a dark sutural margin.
