= Trichaphodioides cinerascens =

Scientific classification
- Kingdom: Animalia
- Phylum: Arthropoda
- Clade: Pancrustacea
- Class: Insecta
- Order: Coleoptera
- Suborder: Polyphaga
- Infraorder: Scarabaeiformia
- Family: Scarabaeidae
- Genus: Trichaphodioides
- Species: T. cinerascens

Binomial name
- Trichaphodioides cinerascens (Klug, 1855)

Synonyms
- Aphodius cinerascens Klug, 1855; Aphodius imperiosus Schmidt, 1910

Species of beetle

Trichaphodioides cinerascens is a species of beetle of the family Scarabaeidae. It is found in Chad, Ethiopia, Ivory Coast, Kenya, Mozambique, Namibia, Niger, the Democratic Republic of the Congo, the Republic of the Congo, Senegal, Somalia, Sudan, Tanzania and Zimbabwe.

== Description ==
Adults reach a length of about 5 mm (0.20 in). They have a broad, flat, blackish-brown body, with the pronotum yellowish-red at the sides and with the tips of the elytra slightly lighter.
