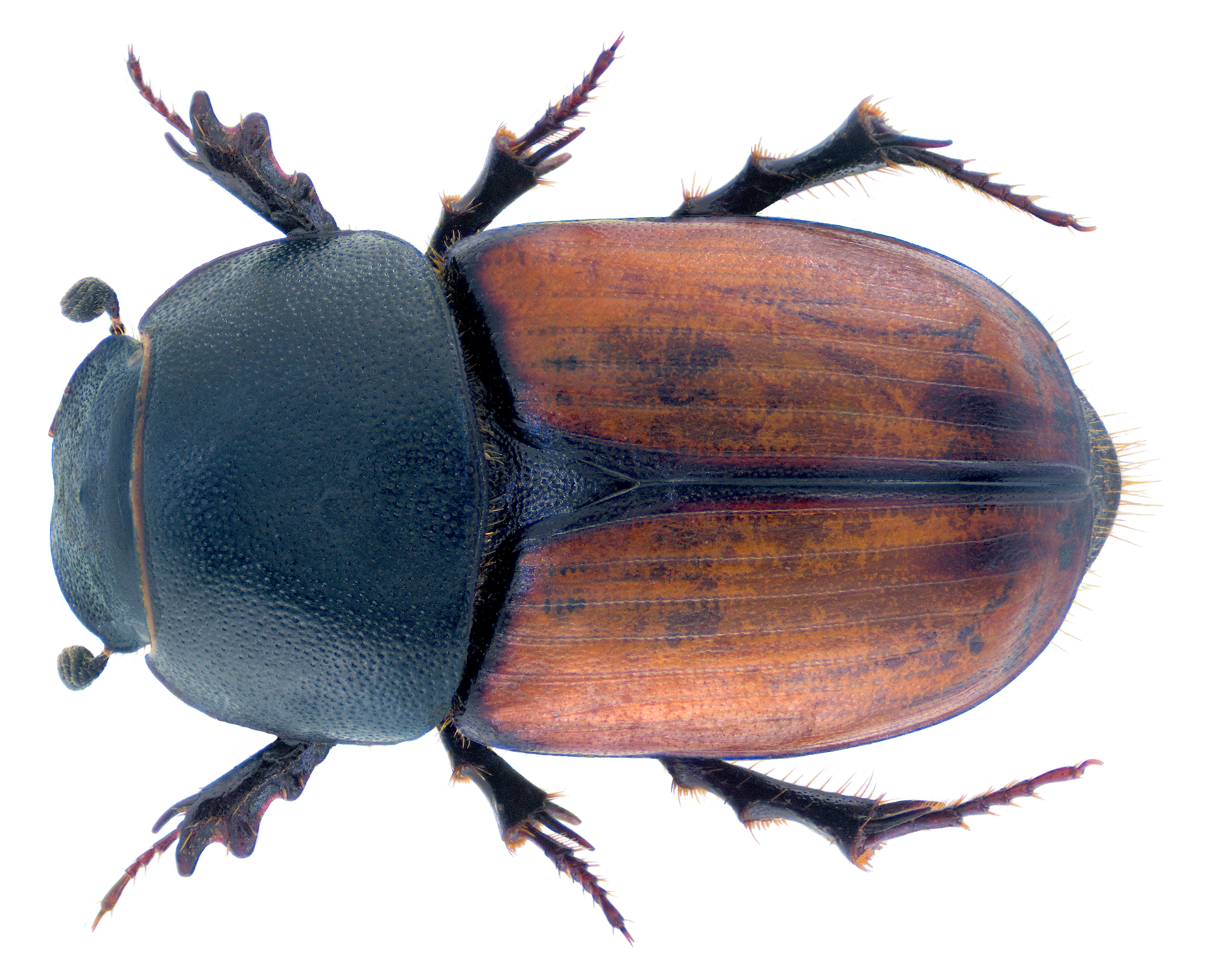
- Colobopterus brignolii, Turkey

Scientific classification
- Kingdom: Animalia
- Phylum: Arthropoda
- Clade: Pancrustacea
- Class: Insecta
- Order: Coleoptera
- Suborder: Polyphaga
- Infraorder: Scarabaeiformia
- Family: Scarabaeidae
- Subfamily: Aphodiinae
- Tribe: Aphodiini
- Genus: Colobopterus; Mulsant, 1842

= Colobopterus =

Genus of scarab beetles

Colobopterus is a genus of scarab beetles in the family Scarabaeidae. There are about six described species in Colobopterus, found in Asia, Europe, and North America.

== Species ==
These six species belong to the genus Colobopterus:

- Colobopterus brignolii (Carpaneto, 1973)
- Colobopterus erraticus (Linnaeus, 1758)
- Colobopterus indagator (Mannerheim, 1849)
- Colobopterus notabilipennis Petrovitz, 1972
- Colobopterus propraetor (Balthasar, 1932)
- Colobopterus quadratus (Reiche, 1847)
