= Trichaphodioides =

Scientific classification
- Kingdom: Animalia
- Phylum: Arthropoda
- Clade: Pancrustacea
- Class: Insecta
- Order: Coleoptera
- Suborder: Polyphaga
- Infraorder: Scarabaeiformia
- Family: Scarabaeidae
- Subfamily: Aphodiinae
- Tribe: Aphodiini
- Genus: Trichaphodioides; Paulian, 1942

Genus of beetles

Trichaphodioides is a genus of beetles of the family Scarabaeidae.

== Species ==
- Trichaphodioides bellus (Endrödi, 1961)
- Trichaphodioides calcaratus (Boheman, 1857)
- Trichaphodioides cinerascens (Klug, 1855)
- Trichaphodioides detruncatus (Schmidt, 1908)
- Trichaphodioides dimorphus (Petrovitz, 1966)
- Trichaphodioides incertepilosus (Bordat, 1994)
- Trichaphodioides lackneri Bordat, 2015
- Trichaphodioides manifestus (Schmidt, 1910)
- Trichaphodioides marchi (Bordat, 1994)
- Trichaphodioides multus (Bordat, 1994)
- Trichaphodioides pavo (Balthasar, 1939)
- Trichaphodioides pulchellus (Müller, 1941)
- Trichaphodioides schaumi (Harold, 1859)
- Trichaphodioides securifer (Petrovitz, 1958)
- Trichaphodioides seminitidus (Quedenfeldt, 1884)
- Trichaphodioides simoni (Petrovitz, 1959)
- Trichaphodioides simplicitarsis (Müller, 1941)
- Trichaphodioides zborniki (Balthasar, 1935)
- Trichaphodioides zicsii (Endrödi, 1967)
