= Planolinus =

Scientific classification
- Kingdom: Animalia
- Phylum: Arthropoda
- Clade: Pancrustacea
- Class: Insecta
- Order: Coleoptera
- Suborder: Polyphaga
- Infraorder: Scarabaeiformia
- Family: Scarabaeidae
- Subfamily: Aphodiinae
- Tribe: Aphodiini
- Genus: Planolinus; Mulsant & Rey, 1870

Synonyms
- Aphodius (Planolinus) Mulsant & Rey, 1870

Genus of beetles

Planolinus is a genus of beetles of the family Scarabaeidae.

== Species ==
- Planolinus fasciatus (Olivier, 1789)
- Planolinus pratensis (Nomura & Nakane, 1951)
- Planolinus tenellus (Say, 1823)
