= Mendidius bidens =

Scientific classification
- Kingdom: Animalia
- Phylum: Arthropoda
- Clade: Pancrustacea
- Class: Insecta
- Order: Coleoptera
- Suborder: Polyphaga
- Infraorder: Scarabaeiformia
- Family: Scarabaeidae
- Genus: Mendidius
- Species: M. bidens

Binomial name
- Mendidius bidens (Solsky, 1876)

Synonyms
- Aphodius bidens Solsky, 1876

Species of beetle

Mendidius bidens is a species of beetle of the family Scarabaeidae. It is found in Afghanistan, Armenia, Iran, Kazakhstan, Kyrgyzstan, Mongolia, Russia (including Siberia), Turkey, Turkmenistan and Uzbekistan.

== Description ==
Adults reach a length of about 5–6.2 mm (0.20–0.24 in). They have a strongly convex, glossy, mostly glabrous body. The head and pronotum are blackish-brown, with the sides of the latter reddish. The scutellum may be lighter or darker brown. The elytra are reddish-yellowish-brown and the legs are light reddish-brown.
