= Hornosus =

Scientific classification
- Kingdom: Animalia
- Phylum: Arthropoda
- Clade: Pancrustacea
- Class: Insecta
- Order: Coleoptera
- Suborder: Polyphaga
- Infraorder: Scarabaeiformia
- Family: Scarabaeidae
- Subfamily: Aphodiinae
- Tribe: Aphodiini
- Genus: Hornosus; Dellacasa, Dellacasa & Gordon, 2015

Genus of beetles

Hornosus is a genus of beetles of the family Scarabaeidae.

== Species ==
- Hornosus larreae (Horn, 1887)
- Hornosus turnbowi Dellacasa, Dellacasa & Gordon, 2015
