= Trichonotulus =

Scientific classification
- Kingdom: Animalia
- Phylum: Arthropoda
- Clade: Pancrustacea
- Class: Insecta
- Order: Coleoptera
- Suborder: Polyphaga
- Infraorder: Scarabaeiformia
- Family: Scarabaeidae
- Subfamily: Aphodiinae
- Tribe: Aphodiini
- Genus: Trichonotulus; Bedel, 1911

Synonyms
- Aphodius (Trichonotulus) Bedel, 1911; Trichonotus Mulsant, 1842

Genus of beetles

Trichonotulus is a genus of beetles of the family Scarabaeidae.

== Species ==
- Trichonotulus amdoensis Král, Rakovič & Mencl, 2015
- Trichonotulus baloghi (Endrödi, 1967)
- Trichonotulus brevisetosus (Petrovitz, 1973)
- Trichonotulus castetsi (Paulian, 1936)
- Trichonotulus cechovskyi Minkina & Mencl, 2018
- Trichonotulus dakarensis (Balthasar, 1960)
- Trichonotulus dzamosanicus (Stebnicka, 1973)
- Trichonotulus erinaceus (Balthasar, 1935)
- Trichonotulus frankkochi (Bordat, 1995)
- Trichonotulus granulidorsis (Bordat, 1990)
- Trichonotulus horaki (Balthasar, 1971)
- Trichonotulus kachelekoensis Bordat, 2016
- Trichonotulus khonensis (Stebnicka, 1982)
- Trichonotulus mirei (Bordat, 1984)
- Trichonotulus mubalensis Paulian, 1954
- Trichonotulus osetinus (Medvedev & Dzhambazish, 1977)
- Trichonotulus pilosellus (Schmidt, 1907)
- Trichonotulus scheuermanni (Endrödi, 1973)
- Trichonotulus scrofa (Fabricius, 1787)
- Trichonotulus secquorum (Bordat, 1990)
- Trichonotulus uganoensis (Petrovitz, 1969)
- Trichonotulus upembanus (Paulian, 1954)
- Trichonotulus verrucosus (Bordat, 1996)
- Trichonotulus villiersi (Petrovitz, 1968)
- Trichonotulus vultuosus (Balthasar, 1971)
