= Orodaliscoides =

Scientific classification
- Kingdom: Animalia
- Phylum: Arthropoda
- Clade: Pancrustacea
- Class: Insecta
- Order: Coleoptera
- Suborder: Polyphaga
- Infraorder: Scarabaeiformia
- Family: Scarabaeidae
- Subfamily: Aphodiinae
- Tribe: Aphodiini
- Genus: Orodaliscoides; Schmidt, 1914

Synonyms
- Aphodius (Orodaliscoides) Schmidt, 1914

Genus of beetles

Orodaliscoides is a genus of beetles of the family Scarabaeidae.

== Species ==
- Orodaliscoides fimbripes (Brown, 1928)
- Orodaliscoides giulianii (Gordon, 1977)
- Orodaliscoides reflexus (Schmidt, 1910)
- Orodaliscoides rugosiceps (Harold, 1859)
