= Mendidius =

Scientific classification
- Kingdom: Animalia
- Phylum: Arthropoda
- Clade: Pancrustacea
- Class: Insecta
- Order: Coleoptera
- Suborder: Polyphaga
- Infraorder: Scarabaeiformia
- Family: Scarabaeidae
- Subfamily: Aphodiinae
- Tribe: Aphodiini
- Genus: Mendidius; Harold, 1868

Synonyms
- Aphodosugrames Endrödi, 1964

Genus of beetles

Mendidius is a genus of beetles of the family Scarabaeidae.

== Species ==
- Mendidius abdurakhmanovi Shokhin, 2018
- Mendidius aculeatus (Robinson, 1940)
- Mendidius atricolor (Reitter, 1892)
- Mendidius baigakumi (Koshantschikov, 1911)
- Mendidius beluchistanicus (Petrovitz, 1962)
- Mendidius berbericus (Balthasar, 1941)
- Mendidius bidens (Solsky, 1876)
- Mendidius bispinifrons (Reitter, 1889)
- Mendidius bivittatus Schmidt, 1922
- Mendidius calliger (Sahlberg, 1908)
- Mendidius curtulus (Harold, 1866)
- Mendidius diffidens (Reitter, 1892)
- Mendidius endroedii (Balthasar, 1967)
- Mendidius fimbriolatus (Mannerheim, 1849)
- Mendidius gobiensis (Endrödi, 1964)
- Mendidius granulifrons (Fairmaire, 1883)
- Mendidius heikertingeri (Balthasar, 1938)
- Mendidius kobakovi (Nikritin, 1979)
- Mendidius laevicollis (Harold, 1866)
- Mendidius mamajevi (Medvedev, 1968)
- Mendidius multiplex (Reitter, 1897)
- Mendidius nelsinae (Medvedev, 1968)
- Mendidius olexai (Král, 1996)
- Mendidius osiris (Koshantschikov, 1916)
- Mendidius palmetincolus (Karsch, 1881)
- Mendidius pseudobidens (Balthasar, 1941)
- Mendidius repetekensis (Nikritin, 1971)
- Mendidius rutilinus (Reitter, 1892)
- Mendidius samarcandicus (Nikritin, 1979)
- Mendidius sijazovi (Lebedev, 1932)
- Mendidius willbergi Reitter, 1891
- Mendidius xerxes (Petrovitz, 1963)
- Mendidius zhantievi (Gusakov, 1997)
