= Cephalocyclus fuliginosus =

Scientific classification
- Kingdom: Animalia
- Phylum: Arthropoda
- Clade: Pancrustacea
- Class: Insecta
- Order: Coleoptera
- Suborder: Polyphaga
- Infraorder: Scarabaeiformia
- Family: Scarabaeidae
- Genus: Cephalocyclus
- Species: C. fuliginosus

Binomial name
- Cephalocyclus fuliginosus (Harold, 1863)

Synonyms
- Aphodius fuliginosus Harold, 1863

Species of beetle

Cephalocyclus fuliginosus is a species of beetle of the family Scarabaeidae. It is found in Guatemala and Mexico (Aguascalientes, Chihuahua, Distrito Federal, Durango, Guanajuato, Hidalgo, Jalisco, México, Michoacán, Morelos, Nayarit, Oaxaca, Puebla, Sinaloa, Tlaxcala, Zacatecas).

== Description ==
Adults reach a length of about 5–7 mm (0.20–0.28 in). They have a feebly convex, sub-shiny body, with the elytra dull. They are dark piceous, sometimes with the elytra paler.

== Life history ==
Specimens have been found in cattle, horse and sheep dung.
