= Stenotothorax =

Scientific classification
- Kingdom: Animalia
- Phylum: Arthropoda
- Clade: Pancrustacea
- Class: Insecta
- Order: Coleoptera
- Suborder: Polyphaga
- Infraorder: Scarabaeiformia
- Family: Scarabaeidae
- Subfamily: Aphodiinae
- Tribe: Aphodiini
- Genus: Stenotothorax; Schmidt, 1914

Synonyms
- Aphodius (Stenotothorax) Schmidt, 1914; Aphodius (Stenobronchus) Schmidt, 1917; Aphodius (Stenothorax) Schmidt, 1914

Genus of beetles

Stenotothorax is a genus of beetles of the family Scarabaeidae.

== Species ==
- Stenotothorax badipes (Melsheimer, 1845)
- Stenotothorax cadaverinus (Mannerheim, 1843)
- Stenotothorax comosus Gordon & Skelley, 2007
- Stenotothorax cribratulus (Schmidt, 1917)
- Stenotothorax dilaticollis (Saylor, 1935)
- Stenotothorax gardneri (Gordon, 2006)
- Stenotothorax gentilis (Horn, 1887)
- Stenotothorax gravis (Fall, 1927)
- Stenotothorax hibernalis (Nakane & Tsukamoto, 1956)
- Stenotothorax lahontanensis Skelley & McPeak, 2018
- Stenotothorax lanei (Saylor, 1940)
- Stenotothorax linsleyi (Van Dyke, 1933)
- Stenotothorax martini (Van Dyke, 1928)
- Stenotothorax mcpeaki Gordon & Skelley, 2007
- Stenotothorax micellus Gordon & Skelley, 2007
- Stenotothorax nevadensis (Horn, 1870)
- Stenotothorax niviviator Skelley & McPeak, 2018
- Stenotothorax odontomonteus Skelley & McPeak, 2018
- Stenotothorax oriens Gordon & Skelley, 2007
- Stenotothorax oviformis (Robinson, 1946)
- Stenotothorax ovipennis (Horn, 1870)
- Stenotothorax parapyriformis Gordon & Skelley, 2007
- Stenotothorax pyriformis (Brown, 1929)
- Stenotothorax rugoclypeus (Hinton, 1934)
- Stenotothorax schneppi Skelley & McPeak, 2018
- Stenotothorax smilodon Skelley & McPeak, 2018
- Stenotothorax sparsus (LeConte, 1878)
- Stenotothorax washtucna (Robinson, 1938)
- Stenotothorax winnemucca Skelley & McPeak, 2018
- Stenotothorax wintoni Skelley & McPeak, 2018
- Stenotothorax woodleyi Gordon, 2006
