= Cinacanthus =

Scientific classification
- Kingdom: Animalia
- Phylum: Arthropoda
- Clade: Pancrustacea
- Class: Insecta
- Order: Coleoptera
- Suborder: Polyphaga
- Infraorder: Scarabaeiformia
- Family: Scarabaeidae
- Subfamily: Aphodiinae
- Tribe: Aphodiini
- Genus: Cinacanthus; Schmidt, 1914

Synonyms
- Aphodius (Cinacanthus) Schmidt, 1914

Genus of beetles

Cinacanthus is a genus of beetles of the family Scarabaeidae.

== Species ==
- Cinacanthus anomalipus (Péringuey, 1901)
- Cinacanthus coquilletti (Linell, 1896)
- Cinacanthus crenicollis (Fall, 1932)
- Cinacanthus crescentus Gordon & Skelley, 2007
- Cinacanthus cunninghami Warner, 2021
- Cinacanthus freudei (Endrödi, 1957)
- Cinacanthus hirsutus (Brown, 1928)
- Cinacanthus hottentotus (Petrovitz, 1964)
- Cinacanthus militaris (LeConte, 1858)
- Cinacanthus penetrans (Schmidt, 1910)
- Cinacanthus tibialis (Schmidt, 1908)
- Cinacanthus ulkei (Gordon, 2006)
