= Tetraclipeoides =

Scientific classification
- Kingdom: Animalia
- Phylum: Arthropoda
- Clade: Pancrustacea
- Class: Insecta
- Order: Coleoptera
- Suborder: Polyphaga
- Infraorder: Scarabaeiformia
- Family: Scarabaeidae
- Subfamily: Aphodiinae
- Tribe: Aphodiini
- Genus: Tetraclipeoides; Schmidt, 1914

Synonyms
- Aphodius (Tetraclipeoides) Schmidt, 1914

Genus of beetles

Tetraclipeoides is a genus of beetles of the family Scarabaeidae.

== Species ==
- Tetraclipeoides acutissimus (Gordon, 1976)
- Tetraclipeoides aemulus (Horn, 1887)
- Tetraclipeoides anomaliceps (Brown, 1929)
- Tetraclipeoides denticulatus (Haldeman, 1848)
- Tetraclipeoides dentiger (LeConte, 1858)
- Tetraclipeoides dentigerulus (Brown, 1929)
- Tetraclipeoides formidatus (Gordon, 1976)
- Tetraclipeoides henryi (Gordon, 1976)
- Tetraclipeoides moquinus (Fall, 1907)
- Tetraclipeoides quadridentatus (Harold, 1861)
- Tetraclipeoides quadridentulus (Fairmaire, 1894)
- Tetraclipeoides testaceiventris (Fall, 1932)
- Tetraclipeoides texanus (Gordon & Skelley, 2007)
