= Nialaphodius =

- Nialaphodius nigrita

Scientific classification
- Kingdom: Animalia
- Phylum: Arthropoda
- Clade: Pancrustacea
- Class: Insecta
- Order: Coleoptera
- Suborder: Polyphaga
- Infraorder: Scarabaeiformia
- Family: Scarabaeidae
- Subfamily: Aphodiinae
- Tribe: Aphodiini
- Genus: Nialaphodius; Kolbe, 1908

Synonyms
- Aphodius (Nialaphodius) Kolbe, 1908

Genus of beetles

Nialaphodius is a genus of beetles of the family Scarabaeidae.

== Species ==
- Nialaphodius calidus (Harold, 1871)
- Nialaphodius nigrita (Fabricius, 1801)
