= Oscarinus =

Scientific classification
- Kingdom: Animalia
- Phylum: Arthropoda
- Clade: Pancrustacea
- Class: Insecta
- Order: Coleoptera
- Suborder: Polyphaga
- Infraorder: Scarabaeiformia
- Family: Scarabaeidae
- Subfamily: Aphodiinae
- Tribe: Aphodiini
- Genus: Oscarinus; Gordon & Skelley, 2007

Genus of beetles

Oscarinus is a genus of scarab beetles in the family Scarabaeidae. There are about 19 described species in Oscarinus, found in North, Central, and South America.

== Species ==
These 19 species belong to the genus Oscarinus:

- Oscarinus abusus (Fall, 1907)
- Oscarinus bottimeri (Cartwright, 1957)
- Oscarinus brimleyi (Cartwright, 1939)
- Oscarinus cabreroi Dellacasa, Dellacasa & Gordon, 2013
- Oscarinus crassuloides (Fall, 1907)
- Oscarinus crassulus (Horn, 1870)
- Oscarinus floridanus (Robinson, 1947)
- Oscarinus indutilis (Harold, 1874)
- Oscarinus lodingi (Cartwright, 1957)
- Oscarinus matiganae (Paulsen, 2006)
- Oscarinus odocoilis (Robinson, 1939)
- Oscarinus pseudabusus (Cartwright, 1957)
- Oscarinus rusicola (Melsheimer, 1845)
- Oscarinus silvanicus (Cartwright, 1972)
- Oscarinus spiniclypeus (Hinton, 1934)
- Oscarinus stuessyi Gordon & Skelley, 2007
- Oscarinus texensis (Cartwright, 1972)
- Oscarinus welderi Gordon & Skelley, 2007
- Oscarinus windsori (Cartwright, 1939)
