= Eupleurus =

Scientific classification
- Kingdom: Animalia
- Phylum: Arthropoda
- Clade: Pancrustacea
- Class: Insecta
- Order: Coleoptera
- Suborder: Polyphaga
- Infraorder: Scarabaeiformia
- Family: Scarabaeidae
- Subfamily: Aphodiinae
- Tribe: Aphodiini
- Genus: Eupleurus; Mulsant, 1842

Genus of beetles

Eupleurus is a genus of beetles of the family Scarabaeidae.

== Species ==
- Eupleurus antiquus (Faldermann, 1835)
- Eupleurus subterraneus (Linnaeus, 1758)
