= Phaeaphodius =

Scientific classification
- Kingdom: Animalia
- Phylum: Arthropoda
- Clade: Pancrustacea
- Class: Insecta
- Order: Coleoptera
- Suborder: Polyphaga
- Infraorder: Scarabaeiformia
- Family: Scarabaeidae
- Subfamily: Aphodiinae
- Tribe: Aphodiini
- Genus: Phaeaphodius; Reitter, 1892

Synonyms
- Aphodius (Phaeaphodius) Reitter, 1892; Aphodius (Limaroides) Balthasar, 1932

Genus of beetles

Phaeaphodius is a genus of beetles of the family Scarabaeidae.

== Species ==
- Phaeaphodius costalis (Gebler, 1848)
- Phaeaphodius dauricus (Harold, 1863)
- Phaeaphodius himalorectus (Ahrens & Stebnicka, 1997)
- Phaeaphodius jouravliowi (Reitter, 1907)
- Phaeaphodius kiulungensis (Balthasar, 1932)
- Phaeaphodius novikovi (Kabakov, 1998)
- Phaeaphodius plutenkoi (Král, 2002)
- Phaeaphodius pupillus (Balthasar, 1961)
- Phaeaphodius rectus (Motschulsky, 1866)
- Phaeaphodius roddi (Koshantschikov, 1911)
- Phaeaphodius tauricola (Hrubant, 1961)
