= Planolinellus =

Scientific classification
- Kingdom: Animalia
- Phylum: Arthropoda
- Clade: Pancrustacea
- Class: Insecta
- Order: Coleoptera
- Suborder: Polyphaga
- Infraorder: Scarabaeiformia
- Family: Scarabaeidae
- Subfamily: Aphodiinae
- Tribe: Aphodiini
- Genus: Planolinellus; Dellacasa & Dellacasa, 2005

Genus of beetles

Planolinellus is a genus of beetles of the family Scarabaeidae.

== Species ==
- Planolinellus grzegorzi Minkina, 2017
- Planolinellus rufoanalis (Petrovitz, 1961)
- Planolinellus vittatus (Say, 1825)
