= Cephalocyclus =

Scientific classification
- Kingdom: Animalia
- Phylum: Arthropoda
- Clade: Pancrustacea
- Class: Insecta
- Order: Coleoptera
- Suborder: Polyphaga
- Infraorder: Scarabaeiformia
- Family: Scarabaeidae
- Subfamily: Aphodiinae
- Tribe: Aphodiini
- Genus: Cephalocyclus; Dellacasa & Gordon & Dellacasa, 1998

Genus of beetles

Cephalocyclus is a genus of beetles of the family Scarabaeidae.

== Species ==
- Cephalocyclus bordati Dellacasa, Dellacasa & Gordon, 2007
- Cephalocyclus carmenae Dellacasa, Dellacasa & Gordon, 2007
- Cephalocyclus cartagoensis Dellacasa, Dellacasa & Gordon, 2007
- Cephalocyclus costaricensis Dellacasa, Dellacasa & Gordon, 2007
- Cephalocyclus durangoensis (Bates, 1887)
- Cephalocyclus fuliginosus (Harold, 1863)
- Cephalocyclus gravidus (Harold, 1863)
- Cephalocyclus halffteri Dellacasa, Dellacasa & Gordon, 2007
- Cephalocyclus hogei (Bates, 1887)
- Cephalocyclus howdenorum Dellacasa, Dellacasa & Gordon, 2007
- Cephalocyclus iohannisgabrielis Dellacasa & Arriaga-Jiménez, 2020
- Cephalocyclus lagoi Dellacasa, Dellacasa & Gordon, 2007
- Cephalocyclus luridiventris (Harold, 1862)
- Cephalocyclus luteolus (Horn, 1887)
- Cephalocyclus majomaensis Dellacasa, Dellacasa & Gordon, 2013
- Cephalocyclus mexicanus (Harold, 1862)
- Cephalocyclus moroni Minor, Dellacasa & Dellacasa, 2015
- Cephalocyclus ordonezi Dellacasa, Dellacasa & Gordon, 2007
- Cephalocyclus potosinus Dellacasa, Dellacasa & Gordon, 2007
- Cephalocyclus pseudofuliginosus Dellacasa, Dellacasa & Gordon, 2011
- Cephalocyclus pullatus (Schmidt, 1914)
- Cephalocyclus puncticeps (Harold, 1862)
- Cephalocyclus rockefelleri Dellacasa, Dellacasa & Gordon, 2007
- Cephalocyclus stebnickae Deloya & Ibanez-bernal, 2000
- Cephalocyclus villosipes (Harold, 1862)
