= Mendidius palmetincolus =

Scientific classification
- Kingdom: Animalia
- Phylum: Arthropoda
- Clade: Pancrustacea
- Class: Insecta
- Order: Coleoptera
- Suborder: Polyphaga
- Infraorder: Scarabaeiformia
- Family: Scarabaeidae
- Genus: Mendidius
- Species: M. palmetincolus

Binomial name
- Mendidius palmetincolus (Karsch, 1881)

Synonyms
- Aphodius palmetincolus Karsch, 1881; Aphodius (Mendidius) assectator Balthasar, 1961; Aphodius (Mendidius) pseudofimbriolatus Petrovitz, 1961; Aphodius dubius Schmidt, 1907; Aphodius fimbriolatus Reiche & Saulcy, 1856

Species of beetle

Mendidius palmetincolus is a species of beetle of the family Scarabaeidae. It is found in Algeria, Egypt, Iraq, Israel, Jordan, Kuwait, Libya, Morocco, Saudi Arabia and Tunisia.

== Description ==
Adults reach a length of about 4–4.5 mm (0.16–0.18 in). They have a strongly convex, glabrous, shining body. The back of the head and the disc of the pronotum are brown, while the anterior margin of the head and the lateral areas of the pronotum are yellowish-brown. The scutellum has a dark border and the elytra are pale yellow, with a darkened sutural margin. The legs are light reddish-brown.
