= Neotrichonotulus =

Scientific classification
- Kingdom: Animalia
- Phylum: Arthropoda
- Clade: Pancrustacea
- Class: Insecta
- Order: Coleoptera
- Suborder: Polyphaga
- Infraorder: Scarabaeiformia
- Family: Scarabaeidae
- Subfamily: Aphodiinae
- Tribe: Aphodiini
- Genus: Neotrichonotulus; Dellacasa, Gordon & Dellacasa, 2004

Genus of beetles

Neotrichonotulus is a genus of beetles of the family Scarabaeidae.

== Species ==
- Neotrichonotulus inurbanus (Gordon & Howden, 1973)
- Neotrichonotulus perotensis (Deloya & Lobo, 1996)
- Neotrichonotulus urangai (Islas, 1955)
