= Pseudagolius =

Scientific classification
- Kingdom: Animalia
- Phylum: Arthropoda
- Clade: Pancrustacea
- Class: Insecta
- Order: Coleoptera
- Suborder: Polyphaga
- Infraorder: Scarabaeiformia
- Family: Scarabaeidae
- Subfamily: Aphodiinae
- Tribe: Aphodiini
- Genus: Pseudagolius; Schmidt, 1914

Synonyms
- Aphodius (Pseudagolius) Schmidt, 1914

Genus of beetles

Pseudagolius is a genus of beetles of the family Scarabaeidae.

== Species ==
- Pseudagolius bicolor (Say, 1823)
- Pseudagolius caballeroi (Islas, 1945)
- Pseudagolius coloradensis (Horn, 1870)
- Pseudagolius warneri Skelley & Gordon, 2007
