= List of dung beetle and chafer (Scarabaeoidea) species recorded in Great Britain =

This is a list of the dung beetle and chafer (Scarabaeoidea) species recorded in Great Britain. For other beetles, see List of beetles of Great Britain.

Family Lucanidae Latreille, 1804

- Sinodendron cylindricum (Linnaeus, 1758)
- Lucanus cervus (Linnaeus, 1758)
- Platycerus caraboides (Linnaeus, 1758)
- Dorcus parallelipipedus (Linnaeus, 1758)

Family Trogidae MacLeay, 1819

- Trox perlatus (Goeze, 1777)
- Trox sabulosus (Linnaeus, 1758)
- Trox scaber (Linnaeus, 1767)

Family Bolboceratidae Mulsant, 1842

- Odonteus armiger (Scopoli, 1772)

Family Geotrupidae Latreille, 1802

- Typhaeus typhoeus (Linnaeus, 1758)
- Anoplotrupes stercorosus (Scriba, 1791)
- Geotrupes mutator (Marsham, 1802)
- Geotrupes spiniger (Marsham, 1802)
- Geotrupes stercorarius (Linnaeus, 1758)
- Trypocopris pyrenaeus (Charpentier, 1825)
- Trypocopris vernalis (Linnaeus, 1758)

Family Scarabaeidae Latreille, 1802

- Aegialia arenaria (Fabricius, 1787)
- Aegialia insularis Pittino, 2006
- Aegialia rufa (Fabricius, 1792)
- Aphodius depressus (Kugelann, 1792)
- Aphodius luridus (Fabricius, 1775) ?
- Aphodius rufipes (Linnaeus, 1758)
- Aphodius lapponum Gyllenhal, 1808
- Aphodius nemoralis Erichson, 1848
- Aphodius ater (De Geer, 1774)
- Aphodius constans Duftschmid, 1805
- Aphodius rufus (Moll, 1782)
- Aphodius sordidus (Fabricius, 1775)
- Aphodius brevis Erichson, 1848
- Aphodius fimetarius (Linnaeus, 1758)
- Aphodius foetens (Fabricius, 1787)
- Aphodius foetidus (Herbst, 1783)
- Aphodius pedellus (De Geer, 1774)
- Aphodius ictericus (Laicharting, 1781)
- Aphodius granarius (Linnaeus, 1767)
- Aphodius conspurcatus (Linnaeus, 1758)
- Aphodius distinctus (O. F. Müller, 1776)
- Aphodius paykulli Bedel, 1907
- Aphodius erraticus (Linnaeus, 1758)
- Aphodius merdarius (Fabricius, 1775)
- Aphodius pusillus (Herbst, 1789)
- Aphodius coenosus (Panzer, 1798)
- Aphodius subterraneus (Linnaeus, 1758)
- Aphodius lividus (Olivier, 1789)
- Aphodius zenkeri Germar, 1813
- Aphodius niger (Illiger, 1798)
- Aphodius plagiatus (Linnaeus, 1767)
- Aphodius consputus Creutzer, 1799
- Aphodius prodromus (Brahm, 1790)
- Aphodius punctatosulcatus Sturm, 1805
- Aphodius sphacelatus (Panzer, 1798)
- Aphodius contaminatus (Herbst, 1783)
- Aphodius obliteratus Sturm, 1823
- Aphodius haemorrhoidalis (Linnaeus, 1758)
- Aphodius quadrimaculatus (Linnaeus, 1761)
- Aphodius arenarius (Olivier, 1789)
- Aphodius borealis Gyllenhal, 1827
- Aphodius fasciatus (Olivier, 1789)
- Aphodius porcus (Fabricius, 1792)
- Aphodius fossor (Linnaeus, 1758)
- Aphodius sticticus (Panzer, 1798)
- Euheptaulacus sus (Herbst, 1783)
- Euheptaulacus villosus (Gyllenhal in Schönherr, 1806)
- Heptaulacus testudinarius (Fabricius, 1775)
- Oxyomus sylvestris (Scopoli, 1763)
- Saprosites mendax (Blackburn, 1892)
- Saprosites natalensis (Peringuey, 1901)
- Brindalus porcicollis (Illiger, 1803)
- Diastictus vulneratus (Sturm, 1805)
- Psammodius asper (Fabricius, 1775)
- Tesarius caelatus (LeConte, 1857)
- Tesarius mcclayi (Cartwright, 1955)
- Pleurophorus caesus (Creutzer in Panzer, 1796)
- Rhyssemus germanus (Linnaeus, 1767)
- Copris lunaris (Linnaeus, 1758)
- Onthophagus taurus (Schreber, 1759)
- Onthophagus coenobita (Herbst, 1783)
- Onthophagus fracticornis (Preyssler, 1790)
- Onthophagus joannae Goljan, 1953
- Onthophagus nuchicornis (Linnaeus, 1758)
- Onthophagus similis (Scriba, 1790)
- Onthophagus vacca (Linnaeus, 1767)
- Onthophagus verticicornis (Laicharting, 1781)
- Hoplia philanthus (Füessly, 1775)
- Melolontha hippocastani Fabricius, 1801
- Melolontha melolontha (Linnaeus, 1758)
- Polyphylla fullo (Linnaeus, 1758)
- Amphimallon ochraceum (Knoch, 1801)
- Amphimallon solstitiale (Linnaeus, 1758)
- Omaloplia ruricola (Fabricius, 1775) ?
- Serica brunnea (Linnaeus, 1758)
- Anomala dubia (Scopoli, 1763)
- Phyllopertha horticola (Linnaeus, 1758) ?
- Cetonia aurata (Linnaeus, 1758)
- Protaetia metallica (Herbst, 1782)
- Gnorimus nobilis (Linnaeus, 1758)
- Gnorimus variabilis (Linnaeus, 1758)
- Trichius fasciatus (Linnaeus, 1758)
- Trichius rosaceus (Voët, 1769)
