= Melinopterus wittmeri =

Scientific classification
- Kingdom: Animalia
- Phylum: Arthropoda
- Clade: Pancrustacea
- Class: Insecta
- Order: Coleoptera
- Suborder: Polyphaga
- Infraorder: Scarabaeiformia
- Family: Scarabaeidae
- Genus: Melinopterus
- Species: M. wittmeri

Binomial name
- Melinopterus wittmeri (Petrovitz, 1975)

Synonyms
- Aphodius (Melinopterus) wittmeri Petrovitz, 1975

Species of beetle

Melinopterus wittmeri is a species of beetle of the family Scarabaeidae. It is found in Bhutan.

== Taxonomy ==
The taxonomic status of this species is unclear. Both Stebnicka and Rössner, who studied the holotype and paratype of the species described by Petrovitz in 1975 have concluded that the type series is in fact a mix of two species. The specimens that do not match the description given by Petrovitz, seem to actually be specimens of Pharaphodius costatulus (now Gilletianus costatulus), or a closely allied species. With regard to the specimens that do match the original description: Červenka thought they belong to the Paracrossidius genus, while Dellacasa concluded they belong to Coptochiroides. This last assessment was supported by Rössner in 2018, but he did not formally transfer the species, pending further investigation.
