= Planolinoides =

Scientific classification
- Kingdom: Animalia
- Phylum: Arthropoda
- Clade: Pancrustacea
- Class: Insecta
- Order: Coleoptera
- Suborder: Polyphaga
- Infraorder: Scarabaeiformia
- Family: Scarabaeidae
- Subfamily: Aphodiinae
- Tribe: Aphodiini
- Genus: Planolinoides; Dellacasa & Dellacasa, 2005

Genus of beetles

Planolinoides is a genus of beetles of the family Scarabaeidae.

== Species ==
- Planolinoides aenictus (Cooper & Gordon, 1987)
- Planolinoides borealis (Gyllenhal, 1827)
- Planolinoides duplex (LeConte, 1878)
- Planolinoides neotomae (Fall, 1907)
- Planolinoides pectoralis (LeConte, 1857)
