= Gilletianus luzonensis =

Scientific classification
- Kingdom: Animalia
- Phylum: Arthropoda
- Clade: Pancrustacea
- Class: Insecta
- Order: Coleoptera
- Suborder: Polyphaga
- Infraorder: Scarabaeiformia
- Family: Scarabaeidae
- Genus: Gilletianus
- Species: G. luzonensis

Binomial name
- Gilletianus luzonensis Ochi, Kon & Kakizoe, 2016

Species of beetle

Gilletianus luzonensis is a species of beetle of the family Scarabaeidae. It is found in the Philippines (Luzon).

== Description ==
Adults reach a length of about 5–5.5 mm (0.20–0.22 in). They have an elongate-oval, not very convex, brown to dark brown body. The head and pronotum are slightly shining and glabrous, while the elytra are less shining and covered with short fine hairs in apical half.

== Etymology ==
The species name refers to the type locality, Luzon.
