= Limarus hirtipennis =

Scientific classification
- Kingdom: Animalia
- Phylum: Arthropoda
- Clade: Pancrustacea
- Class: Insecta
- Order: Coleoptera
- Suborder: Polyphaga
- Infraorder: Scarabaeiformia
- Family: Scarabaeidae
- Genus: Limarus
- Species: L. hirtipennis

Binomial name
- Limarus hirtipennis (Lucas, 1846)

Synonyms
- Aphodius hirtipennis Lucas, 1846

Species of beetle

Limarus hirtipennis is a species of beetle of the family Scarabaeidae. It is found in Algeria and Tunisia.

== Description ==
Adults reach a length of about 4–5.5 mm (0.16–0.22 in). They have a strongly convex, shining body, with long hairs on the sides of the pronotum and the entire elytra. They are blackish-brown, with the head, pronotum and elytra reddish-brown. The legs are yellowish-brown.
