= Megatelus brahminus =

Scientific classification
- Kingdom: Animalia
- Phylum: Arthropoda
- Clade: Pancrustacea
- Class: Insecta
- Order: Coleoptera
- Suborder: Polyphaga
- Infraorder: Scarabaeiformia
- Family: Scarabaeidae
- Genus: Megatelus
- Species: M. brahminus

Binomial name
- Megatelus brahminus (Harold, 1879)

Synonyms
- Aphodius brahminus Harold, 1879; Aphodius (Megatelus) brahminus laotianus Dellacasa, 1986; Aphodius (Megatelus) scolytiformis Reitter, 1892

Species of beetle

Megatelus brahminus is a species of beetle of the family Scarabaeidae. It is found in Cambodia, Laos, Myanmar and Thailand.

== Description ==
Adults reach a length of about 4–5 mm (0.16–0.20 in). They have a shortly oval, convex, shiny body, although apical third of the elytra is pubescent. They are blackish, but the elytra usually have a reddish spot, although they might also be blackish with two small pale reddish spots.
