= Melinopterus pubescens =

Scientific classification
- Kingdom: Animalia
- Phylum: Arthropoda
- Clade: Pancrustacea
- Class: Insecta
- Order: Coleoptera
- Suborder: Polyphaga
- Infraorder: Scarabaeiformia
- Family: Scarabaeidae
- Genus: Melinopterus
- Species: M. pubescens

Binomial name
- Melinopterus pubescens (Sturm, 1800)

Synonyms
- Aphodius pubescens Sturm, 1800; Aphodius tabidus Erichson, 1848

Species of beetle

Melinopterus pubescens is a species of beetle of the family Scarabaeidae. It is found in Albania, Armenia, Austria, Azerbaijan, Belgium, Bosnia and Herzegovina, Bulgaria, Croatia, the Czech Republic, Germany, Greece, Hungary, Iran, Israel, Jordan, Macedonia, Poland, Romania, Russia, Slovakia, Switzerland, Syria, Tunisia, Turkey and Ukraine.

== Description ==
Adults reach a length of about 4–6.5 mm (0.16–0.26 in). They have a slender body. The head is black with the sides reddish-yellow. The pronotum is black with yellowish lateral margins and the elytra are yellowish-brown with a darker suture and a diffuse spot.
