= Coptochiroides laotianus =

Scientific classification
- Kingdom: Animalia
- Phylum: Arthropoda
- Clade: Pancrustacea
- Class: Insecta
- Order: Coleoptera
- Suborder: Polyphaga
- Infraorder: Scarabaeiformia
- Family: Scarabaeidae
- Genus: Coptochiroides
- Species: C. laotianus

Binomial name
- Coptochiroides laotianus (Červenka, 2005)

Synonyms
- Aphodius (Coptochiroides) laotianus Červenka, 2005

Species of beetle

Coptochiroides laotianus is a species of beetle of the family Scarabaeidae. It is found in Laos.

== Description ==
Adults reach a length of about 3.2 mm (0.13 in). They have an oblong-oval, convex, shining body. The elytra are glabrous. The elytra, pronotum and head are red-brown, with the sides of the pronotum and the clypeus lighter. The legs are lighter brown.

== Etymology ==
The species name is derived from the country of origin of the type material.
