= Gilletianus cavitensis =

Scientific classification
- Kingdom: Animalia
- Phylum: Arthropoda
- Clade: Pancrustacea
- Class: Insecta
- Order: Coleoptera
- Suborder: Polyphaga
- Infraorder: Scarabaeiformia
- Family: Scarabaeidae
- Genus: Gilletianus
- Species: G. cavitensis

Binomial name
- Gilletianus cavitensis Ochi, Kon & Kakizoe, 2016

Species of beetle

Gilletianus cavitensis is a species of beetle of the family Scarabaeidae. It is found in the Philippines (Luzon).

== Description ==
Adults reach a length of about 4.1–4.9 mm (0.16–0.19 in). They have an elongate-oval, slightly convex, light brown body, with the head and pronotum often darker. The head and pronotum are very shining and glabrous, while the elytra are weakly shining and covered with short fine hairs in the apical fourth.

== Etymology ==
The species name refers to the type locality, Cavite, near Manila.
