= Paracrossidius kozlovi =

Scientific classification
- Kingdom: Animalia
- Phylum: Arthropoda
- Clade: Pancrustacea
- Class: Insecta
- Order: Coleoptera
- Suborder: Polyphaga
- Infraorder: Scarabaeiformia
- Family: Scarabaeidae
- Genus: Paracrossidius
- Species: P. kozlovi

Binomial name
- Paracrossidius kozlovi (Koshantschikov, 1916)

Synonyms
- Aphodius (Acrossidius) kozlovi Koshantschikov, 1916

Species of beetle

Paracrossidius kozlovi is a species of beetle of the family Scarabaeidae. It is found in Mongolia.

== Description ==
Adults reach a length of about 8.5 mm (0.33 in). They have an elongate, not very glossy, brown body, with the head reddish-brown and a darker back. The base and sides of the elytra are yellowish-brown. The dorsal surface is glabrous.
