= Gilletianus segmentarius =

Scientific classification
- Kingdom: Animalia
- Phylum: Arthropoda
- Clade: Pancrustacea
- Class: Insecta
- Order: Coleoptera
- Suborder: Polyphaga
- Infraorder: Scarabaeiformia
- Family: Scarabaeidae
- Genus: Gilletianus
- Species: G. segmentarius

Binomial name
- Gilletianus segmentarius (Harold, 1879)

Synonyms
- Aphodius segmentarius Harold, 1879

Species of beetle

Gilletianus segmentarius is a species of beetle of the family Scarabaeidae. It is found in Myanmar.

== Description ==
Adults reach a length of about 7–7.5 mm (0.28–0.30 in). They have a slightly convex, dark chestnut-brown body, with the sides of the pronotum and often also the sides of the elytra lighter reddish.
