= Bodilopsis aquilus =

Scientific classification
- Kingdom: Animalia
- Phylum: Arthropoda
- Clade: Pancrustacea
- Class: Insecta
- Order: Coleoptera
- Suborder: Polyphaga
- Infraorder: Scarabaeiformia
- Family: Scarabaeidae
- Genus: Bodilopsis
- Species: B. aquilus

Binomial name
- Bodilopsis aquilus (Schmidt, 1917)

Synonyms
- Aphodius (Agrilinus) aquilus Schmidt, 1917; Aphodius (Pseudacrossus) pfefferi Balthasar, 1932; Aphodius (Pseudacrossus) pfefferi versabilis Balthasar, 1932; Aphodius (Agrilinus) aquilus bellus Schmidt, 1917

Species of beetle

Bodilopsis aquilus is a species of beetle of the family Scarabaeidae. It is found in China (Sichuan, Yunnan) and Vietnam.

== Description ==
Adults reach a length of about 6–7.5 mm (0.24–0.30 in). They have an elongate, convex, shiny body, but with the elytra dull preapically. They are pitch-black, with the sides of the pronotum and apex of the elytra reddish. The legs are dark brown and the antennal club is testaceous.
