= Melinopterus scuticollis =

Scientific classification
- Kingdom: Animalia
- Phylum: Arthropoda
- Clade: Pancrustacea
- Class: Insecta
- Order: Coleoptera
- Suborder: Polyphaga
- Infraorder: Scarabaeiformia
- Family: Scarabaeidae
- Genus: Melinopterus
- Species: M. scuticollis

Binomial name
- Melinopterus scuticollis (Semenov, 1898)

Synonyms
- Aphodius (Volinus) scuticollis Semenov, 1898; Aphodius (Aphodaulacus) alatavicus Nikolajev, 1974; Aphodius (Pseudagolius) madari Tesař, 1945; Aphodius (Aphodaulacus) bartosi Balthasar, 1938; Aphodius (Volinus) scuticollis ingenticollis Koshantschikov W., 1912; Aphodius (Volinus) scuticollis triens Koshantschikov, 1911

Species of beetle

Melinopterus scuticollis is a species of beetle of the family Scarabaeidae. It is found in Afghanistan, China (Xinjiang), Iran, Kazakhstan, Kyrgyzstan, Russia (including Siberia), Turkmenistan and Uzbekistan.

== Description ==
Adults reach a length of about 4–6.5 mm (0.16–0.26 in). The dorsal surface is glossy. The head is black, with dark reddish-brown lateral margins. The pronotum is blackish-brown to black, with yellowish lateral margins and the elytra are yellowish-brown, with a darkened suture. The underside is black with light brown legs.
