= Gilletianus proclivis =

Scientific classification
- Kingdom: Animalia
- Phylum: Arthropoda
- Clade: Pancrustacea
- Class: Insecta
- Order: Coleoptera
- Suborder: Polyphaga
- Infraorder: Scarabaeiformia
- Family: Scarabaeidae
- Genus: Gilletianus
- Species: G. proclivis

Binomial name
- Gilletianus proclivis (Balthasar, 1933)

Synonyms
- Aphodius (Gilletianus) proclivis Balthasar, 1933

Species of beetle

Gilletianus proclivis is a species of beetle of the family Scarabaeidae. It is found in China (Yunnan) and Korea.

== Description ==
Adults reach a length of about 4.5 mm (0.18 in). They have an oval-elongate, convex, shiny body. The elytra have short hairs. The head and pronotum are brownish, with the margins of the clypeus and lateral margins of the pronotum paler. The elytra are testaceous, but a bit darker apically and with blackish striae. The legs are brown-reddish and the club of the antennae is reddish.
