= Paracrossidius radekcervenkai =

Scientific classification
- Kingdom: Animalia
- Phylum: Arthropoda
- Clade: Pancrustacea
- Class: Insecta
- Order: Coleoptera
- Suborder: Polyphaga
- Infraorder: Scarabaeiformia
- Family: Scarabaeidae
- Genus: Paracrossidius
- Species: P. radekcervenkai

Binomial name
- Paracrossidius radekcervenkai Červenka, 2017

Species of beetle

Paracrossidius radekcervenkai is a species of beetle of the family Scarabaeidae. It is found in China (Yunnan).

== Description ==
Adults reach a length of about 6.5–8.8 mm (0.26–0.35 in). They have a weakly convex, oblong-oval body, with the head and pronotum moderately glossy and the elytra shagreened and less glossy. The head, pronotum and basal two-thirds of the elytra are glabrous, while the rest of the elytra is setaceous. The elytra and pronotum are brown, the head is darker and the sides of the pronotum and sutural area of the elytra are lighter reddish brown. The legs are also lighter brown.

== Etymology ==
The species is named in honour of Radek Červenka.
