= Psammodius basalis =

Scientific classification
- Kingdom: Animalia
- Phylum: Arthropoda
- Clade: Pancrustacea
- Class: Insecta
- Order: Coleoptera
- Suborder: Polyphaga
- Infraorder: Scarabaeiformia
- Family: Scarabaeidae
- Genus: Psammodius
- Species: P. basalis

Binomial name
- Psammodius basalis (Mulsant & Rey, 1870)

Synonyms
- Psammobius basalis Mulsant & Rey, 1870

Species of beetle

Psammodius basalis is a species of aphodiine dung beetle in the family Scarabaeidae. It is found in Bulgaria, Cyprus, France, Greece, Italy, Portugal, Romania, Russia, Spain, Ukraine and on the Azores. It was also introduced to the United States, where it has been recorded from Maryland.

== Description ==
Adults reach a length of about 3.5–4.5 mm (0.14–0.18 in). They have a strongly convex, dark or light reddish-brown to dark brown body, with lighter markings. They are lustrous, sometimes with a more or less greasy sheen
