= Gilletianus asinensis =

Scientific classification
- Kingdom: Animalia
- Phylum: Arthropoda
- Clade: Pancrustacea
- Class: Insecta
- Order: Coleoptera
- Suborder: Polyphaga
- Infraorder: Scarabaeiformia
- Family: Scarabaeidae
- Genus: Gilletianus
- Species: G. asinensis

Binomial name
- Gilletianus asinensis Ochi, Kon & Kakizoe, 2016

Species of beetle

Gilletianus asinensis is a species of beetle of the family Scarabaeidae. It is found in the Philippines (Luzon).

== Description ==
Adults reach a length of about 5.4–6.1 mm (0.21–0.24 in). They have an elongate-oval, strongly convex, light brown to brown body. The head and pronotum are shining and glabrous, while the elytra are weakly shining and partly covered with short fine hairs.

== Etymology ==
The species name refers to the type locality, the Asin Hot Spring.
