= Melinopterus tingens =

Scientific classification
- Kingdom: Animalia
- Phylum: Arthropoda
- Clade: Pancrustacea
- Class: Insecta
- Order: Coleoptera
- Suborder: Polyphaga
- Infraorder: Scarabaeiformia
- Family: Scarabaeidae
- Genus: Melinopterus
- Species: M. tingens

Binomial name
- Melinopterus tingens (Reitter, 1892)

Synonyms
- Aphodius (Melinopterus) punctatosulcatus tingens Reitter, 1892; Aphodius (Melinopterus) sphacelatus litigiosus Báguena, 1930

Species of beetle

Melinopterus tingens is a species of beetle of the family Scarabaeidae. It is found in Algeria, France (Corsica), Italy (Sicily, Sardinia), Morocco, Portugal, Spain and Tunisia.

== Description ==
Adults reach a length of about 5–7 mm (0.20–0.28 in). The head is black with yellowish sides. The pronotum is black, with yellowish margins on the sides and a yellowish band at the base. The elytra have a dark suture and a brownish patch.
