= Melinopterus imamae =

Scientific classification
- Kingdom: Animalia
- Phylum: Arthropoda
- Clade: Pancrustacea
- Class: Insecta
- Order: Coleoptera
- Suborder: Polyphaga
- Infraorder: Scarabaeiformia
- Family: Scarabaeidae
- Genus: Melinopterus
- Species: M. imamae

Binomial name
- Melinopterus imamae (Stebnicka, 1988)

Synonyms
- Aphodius (Melinopterus) imamae Stebnicka, 1988

Species of beetle

Melinopterus imamae is a species of beetle of the family Scarabaeidae. It is found in Iran and Iraq.

== Description ==
Adults reach a length of about 3.6–5.4 mm (0.14–0.21 in). They have an elongate, subparallel body. The head black with reddish-brown sides. The pronotum is black, with reddish-brown sides and lighter anterior corners. The elytra are dark chestnut-brown to blackish-brown and glossy.
