= Gilletianus reichei =

Scientific classification
- Kingdom: Animalia
- Phylum: Arthropoda
- Clade: Pancrustacea
- Class: Insecta
- Order: Coleoptera
- Suborder: Polyphaga
- Infraorder: Scarabaeiformia
- Family: Scarabaeidae
- Genus: Gilletianus
- Species: G. reichei

Binomial name
- Gilletianus reichei (Harold, 1859)

Synonyms
- Aphodius reichei Harold, 1859; Aphodius carinipennis Motschulsky, 1858; Aphodius binotatus Dalman, 1833

Species of beetle

Gilletianus reichei is a species of beetle of the family Scarabaeidae. It is found in Australia (Queensland), Indonesia (Irian Jaya, Java, Sumatra, Sulawesi), Malaysia (Sabah), the Philippines, Thailand, Vietnam, China (Fujian, Guizhou, Sichuan) and Taiwan.

== Description ==
Adults reach a length of about 6–6.9 mm (0.24–0.27 in). They have an elongate-oval, yellowish brown body, with the head, disc of the pronotum, sutural intervals, elytral striae and preapical spot darker.
