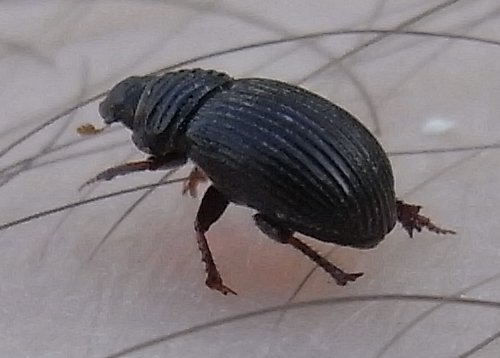

Scientific classification
- Kingdom: Animalia
- Phylum: Arthropoda
- Clade: Pancrustacea
- Class: Insecta
- Order: Coleoptera
- Suborder: Polyphaga
- Infraorder: Scarabaeiformia
- Family: Scarabaeidae
- Tribe: Psammodiini
- Genus: Psammodius; Fallén, 1807

Synonyms
- Psammobius Heer, 1841

= Psammodius =

Genus of beetles

Psammodius is a genus of aphodiine dung beetles in the family Scarabaeidae. There are at least 3 described species in Psammodius.

== Species ==
- Psammodius asper (Fabricius, 1775)
- Psammodius asperoides Pittino, 2007
- Psammodius basalis (Mulsant & Rey, 1870)
- Psammodius besucheti (Petrovitz, 1975)
- Psammodius bilyi Rakovič, 1994
- Psammodius boreoitalicus Mencl, Král & Rakovič, 2022
- Psammodius bulgaricus Mencl, 1982
- Psammodius caucasicus Pittino & Shokhin, 2006
- Psammodius convexus Waterhouse, 1875
- Psammodius danubialis Ádám, 1989
- Psammodius flavolittoralis Kim, 1980
- Psammodius generosus Reitter, 1892
- Psammodius hangangnensis Kim, 1980
- Psammodius jordanus Rakovič, Mencl & Král, 2022
- Psammodius kobayashii Nomura, 1973
- Psammodius laevipennis Costa, 1844
- Psammodius maceki Rakovič, 1994
- Psammodius macnamarae Pittino, 1984
- Psammodius maruyamai Ochi, Kawahara & Inagaki, 2011
- Psammodius nepalensis (Balthasar, 1971)
- Psammodius nocturnus Reitter, 1892
- Psammodius ovatus Pittino, 1983
- Psammodius pierottii Pittino, 1979
- Psammodius plicicollis Erichson, 1848
- Psammodius schmidtii Gistel, 1857
- Psammodius sefrensis (Petrovitz, 1961)
- Psammodius seiferti Rakovič, 1994
- Psammodius sungshinarum Kim, 1980
- Psammodius tesari Rakovič, 1977
