= Psammodius sungshinarum =

Scientific classification
- Kingdom: Animalia
- Phylum: Arthropoda
- Clade: Pancrustacea
- Class: Insecta
- Order: Coleoptera
- Suborder: Polyphaga
- Infraorder: Scarabaeiformia
- Family: Scarabaeidae
- Genus: Psammodius
- Species: P. sungshinarum

Binomial name
- Psammodius sungshinarum Kim, 1980

Species of beetle

Psammodius sungshinarum is a species of beetle of the family Scarabaeidae. It is found in Korea.

== Description ==
Adults reach a length of about 2.5–3.1 mm (0.098–0.122 in). They have an elongate-oval, dull, blackish-brown body, with the clypeus, legs and ventral surface reddish-brown to dark brown.
