= Melinopterus rapax =

Scientific classification
- Kingdom: Animalia
- Phylum: Arthropoda
- Clade: Pancrustacea
- Class: Insecta
- Order: Coleoptera
- Suborder: Polyphaga
- Infraorder: Scarabaeiformia
- Family: Scarabaeidae
- Genus: Melinopterus
- Species: M. rapax

Binomial name
- Melinopterus rapax (Faldermann, 1836)

Synonyms
- Aphodius rapax Faldermann, 1836

Species of beetle

Melinopterus rapax is a species of beetle of the family Scarabaeidae. It is found in Azerbaijan, Georgia, Iran and Russia.

== Description ==
Adults reach a length of about 4.4–6.8 mm (0.17–0.27 in). The head is black to blackish-brown, often with light reddish-yellow sides. The pronotum is black to blackish-brown, with yellowish sides and a yellow base. The elytra have a dark suture and a brown spot. The base, the second and tenth intervals and the apex are light-colored. The elytra of the males have distinct hairs, leaving only the base glabrous, while females are generally glabrous, although they sometimes have a few tiny hairs in the apical region.
