= Gilletianus tonkineus =

Scientific classification
- Kingdom: Animalia
- Phylum: Arthropoda
- Clade: Pancrustacea
- Class: Insecta
- Order: Coleoptera
- Suborder: Polyphaga
- Infraorder: Scarabaeiformia
- Family: Scarabaeidae
- Genus: Gilletianus
- Species: G. tonkineus

Binomial name
- Gilletianus tonkineus (Paulian, 1933)

Synonyms
- Aphodius (Trichaphodius) tonkineus Paulian, 1933

Species of beetle

Gilletianus tonkineus is a species of beetle of the family Scarabaeidae. It is found in Vietnam.

== Description ==
Adults reach a length of about 6 mm (0.24 in). They have an elongate, slightly convex, black body, with the margins of the head, the lateral margins of the pronotum and the base and apex of the elytra lighter. The apical portion of the elytra is pubescent and the upper surface is quite shiny.
