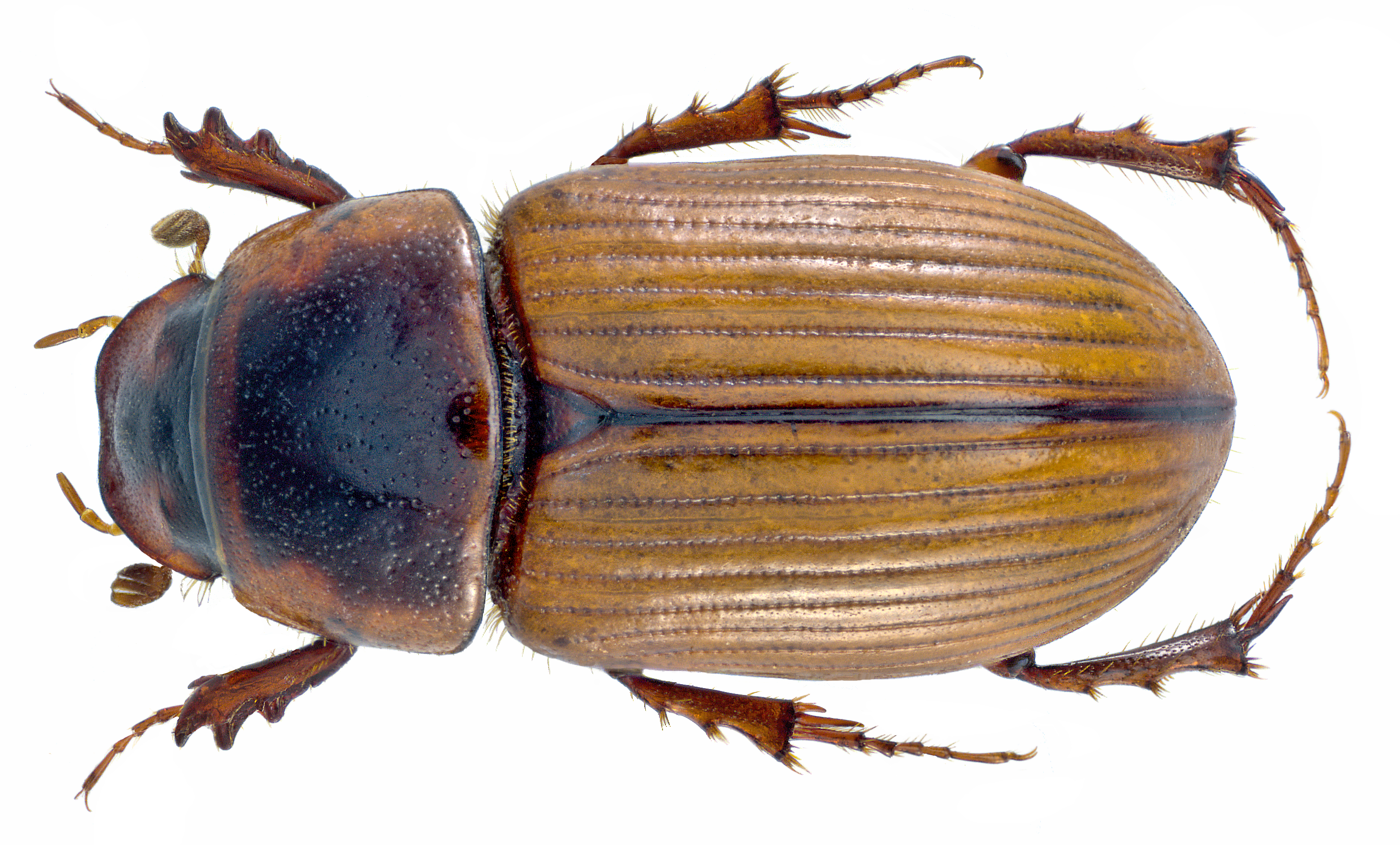
- Bodilopsis sordidus, Germany

Scientific classification
- Kingdom: Animalia
- Phylum: Arthropoda
- Clade: Pancrustacea
- Class: Insecta
- Order: Coleoptera
- Suborder: Polyphaga
- Infraorder: Scarabaeiformia
- Family: Scarabaeidae
- Subfamily: Aphodiinae
- Tribe: Aphodiini
- Genus: Bodilopsis; Adam, 1994

Type species
- Scarabaeus sordidus Fabricius, 1775

= Bodilopsis =

Genus of beetles

Bodilopsis is a genus of scarab beetles in the family Scarabaeidae. There are at least four described species in Bodilopsis, found in Europe and Asia.

== Species ==
These four species belong to the genus Bodilopsis:

- Bodilopsis aquilus (Schmidt, 1916)
- Bodilopsis ogloblini (Semenov & Medvedev, 1928)
- Bodilopsis rufus (Moll, 1782)
- Bodilopsis sordidus (Fabricius, 1775)
