= Brindalus rotundipennis =

Scientific classification
- Kingdom: Animalia
- Phylum: Arthropoda
- Clade: Pancrustacea
- Class: Insecta
- Order: Coleoptera
- Suborder: Polyphaga
- Infraorder: Scarabaeiformia
- Family: Scarabaeidae
- Genus: Brindalus
- Species: B. rotundipennis

Binomial name
- Brindalus rotundipennis (Reitter, 1892)

Synonyms
- Psammodius rotundipennis Reitter, 1892

Species of beetle

Brindalus rotundipennis is a species of beetle of the family Scarabaeidae. It is found in Algeria, Italy, Sardinia, Libya, Morocco, Spain and Tunisia.

== Description ==
Adults reach a length of about 3–4.2 mm (0.12–0.17 in). They have a strongly convex, broadly oval, moderately glossy, blackish-brown body.
