= Melinopterus stolzi =

Scientific classification
- Kingdom: Animalia
- Phylum: Arthropoda
- Clade: Pancrustacea
- Class: Insecta
- Order: Coleoptera
- Suborder: Polyphaga
- Infraorder: Scarabaeiformia
- Family: Scarabaeidae
- Genus: Melinopterus
- Species: M. stolzi

Binomial name
- Melinopterus stolzi (Reitter, 1906)

Synonyms
- Aphodius (Melinopterus) stolzi Reitter, 1906; Aphodius (Melinopterus) stolzi immaculatulus Dellacasa, 1983; Aphodius (Melinopterus) stolzi maculatipennis Dellacasa, 1983

Species of beetle

Melinopterus stolzi is a species of beetle of the family Scarabaeidae. It is found in Albania, France (Corsica), Greece (mainland, Corfu), Italy (Sardinia), Montenegro and Turkey.

== Description ==
Adults reach a length of about 3.5–4.5 mm (0.14–0.18 in). They have a moderately shiny body. The forebody is black, with the sides of the head black or reddish-brown and the sides of the pronotum, elytra and legs yellowish-brown. The elytra usually have a diffuse spot.
