= Gilletianus imasakai =

Scientific classification
- Kingdom: Animalia
- Phylum: Arthropoda
- Clade: Pancrustacea
- Class: Insecta
- Order: Coleoptera
- Suborder: Polyphaga
- Infraorder: Scarabaeiformia
- Family: Scarabaeidae
- Genus: Gilletianus
- Species: G. imasakai

Binomial name
- Gilletianus imasakai Ochi, Kon & Kakizoe, 2016

Species of beetle

Gilletianus imasakai is a species of beetle of the family Scarabaeidae. It is found in Peninsular Malaysia.

== Description ==
Adults reach a length of about 4 mm (0.16 in). They have an elongate-oval, slightly convex, brown to light brown body. The head and pronotum are weakly shining and glabrous, while the elytra are less shining and covered with short fine hairs in apical half.

== Etymology ==
The species is named in honour of Mr. S. Imasaka, who collected the holotype.
