= Bodilopsis rufus =

Scientific classification
- Kingdom: Animalia
- Phylum: Arthropoda
- Clade: Pancrustacea
- Class: Insecta
- Order: Coleoptera
- Suborder: Polyphaga
- Infraorder: Scarabaeiformia
- Family: Scarabaeidae
- Genus: Bodilopsis
- Species: B. rufus

Binomial name
- Bodilopsis rufus (Moll, 1782)

Synonyms
- Scarabaeus rufus Moll, 1782; Aphodius (Bodilus) arvernicus Hoffmann, 1928; Aphodius (Bodilus) rufus ultramontanus Sahlberg, 1926; Aphodius hypocophinus Strand, 1917; Aphodius rufus cohrsi Kolbe, 1911; Aphodius rufescens melancholicus Bouskell, 1901; Aphodius moscoviticus Semenov, 1900; Aphodius moscoviticus piceola Semenov, 1900; Aphodius rufus illigeri Dalla Torre, 1879; Aphodius hypocophus Gistel, 1857; Aphodius pertinens Gistel, 1857; Aphodius scropharum Gistel, 1857; Aphodius rufifrons Dufour, 1851; Aphodius sordidus aurantiacus Mulsant, 1842; Aphodius sordidus melanotus Mulsant, 1842; Aphodius rufescens hypocophus Heer, 1841; Aphodius hypocyphthus Schmidt, 1840; Scarabaeus unicolor Marsham, 1802; Aphodius rufescens Fabricius, 1801; Scarabaeus scybalarius Fabricius, 1781; Scarabaeus castaneus Marsham, 1802; Scarabaeus foetens Olivier, 1789; Scarabaeus arcuatus Moll, 1785

Species of beetle

Bodilopsis rufus, the pale-margined dung beetle, is a species of beetle of the family Scarabaeidae. It is found in Armenia, Austria, Belarus, Belgium, Bosnia and Herzegovina, Bulgaria, China, Croatia, the Czech Republic, Denmark, Estonia, Finland, France, Georgia, Germany, Great Britain, Greece, Hungary, Ireland, Israel, Italy, Kazakhstan, Latvia, Lithuania, Macedonia, Malta, Nepal, the Netherlands, Norway, Poland, Portugal, Romania, Russia (including the Russian Far East and Siberia), Serbia, Slovakia, Slovenia, Spain, Sweden, Switzerland and Ukraine.

== Description ==
Adults reach a length of about 5–7.5 mm (0.20–0.30 in). They have an oblong, convex, shiny, glabrous, chestnut-brown bodt, with the elytral suture and disc of the pronotum dark brown. The legs are brown-reddish and the antennal club is reddish.
