= Psammodius generosus =

Scientific classification
- Kingdom: Animalia
- Phylum: Arthropoda
- Clade: Pancrustacea
- Class: Insecta
- Order: Coleoptera
- Suborder: Polyphaga
- Infraorder: Scarabaeiformia
- Family: Scarabaeidae
- Genus: Psammodius
- Species: P. generosus

Binomial name
- Psammodius generosus Reitter, 1892

Species of beetle

Psammodius generosus is a species of beetle of the family Scarabaeidae. It is found in Armenia, Azerbaijan, Kazakhstan, Russia, Turkmenistan and Uzbekistan.

== Description ==
Adults reach a length of about 2.8–3.3 mm (0.11–0.13 in). They have a shiny, short, strongly convex, yellowish- to reddish-brown body.
