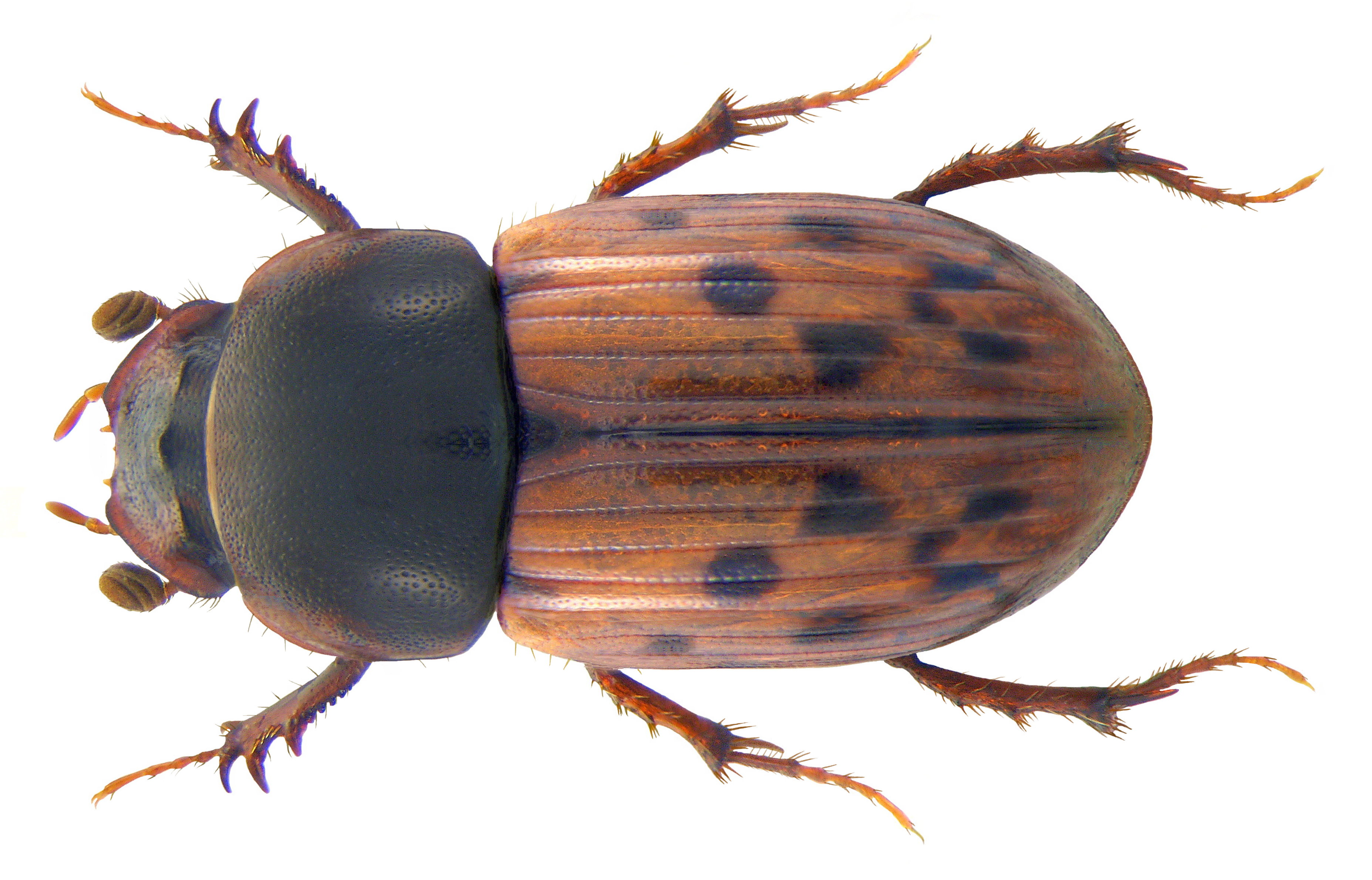

Scientific classification
- Kingdom: Animalia
- Phylum: Arthropoda
- Clade: Pancrustacea
- Class: Insecta
- Order: Coleoptera
- Suborder: Polyphaga
- Infraorder: Scarabaeiformia
- Family: Scarabaeidae
- Genus: Limarus
- Species: L. maculatus

Binomial name
- Limarus maculatus (Sturm, 1800)

Synonyms
- Aphodius maculatus Sturm, 1800; Aphodius (Limarus) maculatus brevifasciata Tesař, 1955; Aphodius maculatus brevifascia Schmidt, 1917; Aphodius maculatus involutus Schmidt, 1917; Aphodius maculatus immaculatus Schilsky, 1888; Aphodius maculatus fasciata Dalla Torre, 1879; Aphodius maculatus obsoleta Dalla Torre, 1879; Aphodius styriacus Grimmer, 1841; Aphodius tessulatus Creutzer, 1799

= Limarus maculatus =

Species of beetle

Limarus maculatus is a species of beetle of the family Scarabaeidae. It is found in Armenia, Austria, Azerbaijan, Belarus, Belgium, Bosnia Herzegovina, Bulgaria, Croatia, the Czech Republic, France, Georgia, Germany, Greece, Hungary, Macedonia, the Netherlands, Poland, Romania, Russia, Slovakia, Slovenia, Switzerland and Ukraine.

== Description ==
Adults reach a length of about 4–5 mm (0.16–0.20 in). They have a strongly convex, glossy, glabrous, blackish-brown to black body, with the anterior margin of the head and the sides of the pronotum light reddish-brown. The elytra are light brown with a blackened suture and two rows of black spots.
