= Megatelus =

Scientific classification
- Kingdom: Animalia
- Phylum: Arthropoda
- Clade: Pancrustacea
- Class: Insecta
- Order: Coleoptera
- Suborder: Polyphaga
- Infraorder: Scarabaeiformia
- Family: Scarabaeidae
- Subfamily: Aphodiinae
- Tribe: Aphodiini
- Genus: Megatelus; Reitter, 1892

Synonyms
- Aphodius (Megatelus) Reitter, 1892

Genus of beetles

Megatelus is a genus of beetles of the family Scarabaeidae.

== Species ==
- Megatelus brahminus (Harold, 1879)
- Megatelus contractus (Klug, 1830)
- Megatelus doriae (Harold, 1871)
