= Limarus =

Scientific classification
- Kingdom: Animalia
- Phylum: Arthropoda
- Clade: Pancrustacea
- Class: Insecta
- Order: Coleoptera
- Suborder: Polyphaga
- Infraorder: Scarabaeiformia
- Family: Scarabaeidae
- Subfamily: Aphodiinae
- Tribe: Aphodiini
- Genus: Limarus; Mulsant & Rey, 1870

Synonyms
- Aphodius (Limarus) Mulsant & Rey, 1870

Genus of beetles

Limarus is a genus of beetles of the family Scarabaeidae.

== Species ==
- Limarus hirtipennis (Lucas, 1846)
- Limarus maculatus (Sturm, 1800)
- Limarus zenkeri (Germar, 1813)
