= Gilletianus therondi =

Scientific classification
- Kingdom: Animalia
- Phylum: Arthropoda
- Clade: Pancrustacea
- Class: Insecta
- Order: Coleoptera
- Suborder: Polyphaga
- Infraorder: Scarabaeiformia
- Family: Scarabaeidae
- Genus: Gilletianus
- Species: G. therondi

Binomial name
- Gilletianus therondi (Balthasar, 1963)

Synonyms
- Aphodius (Trichaphodius) therondi Balthasar, 1963

Species of beetle

Gilletianus therondi is a species of beetle of the family Scarabaeidae. It is found in Cambodia, Malaysia (Sabah) and Vietnam.

== Description ==
Adults reach a length of about 4.4–4.8 mm (0.17–0.19 in). They have an elongate-oval, rather shiny, dark brown body. The sides of the elytra have short, pale hairs. The anterior margin of the head, the sides of the pronotum, and the base and apex of the elytra are lighter, reddish-brown and the legs are lighter brown. The antennal club is pale.
