= Gilletianus seguyi =

Scientific classification
- Kingdom: Animalia
- Phylum: Arthropoda
- Clade: Pancrustacea
- Class: Insecta
- Order: Coleoptera
- Suborder: Polyphaga
- Infraorder: Scarabaeiformia
- Family: Scarabaeidae
- Genus: Gilletianus
- Species: G. seguyi

Binomial name
- Gilletianus seguyi (Paulian, 1945)

Synonyms
- Trichaphodius seguyi Paulian, 1945

Species of beetle

Gilletianus seguyi is a species of beetle of the family Scarabaeidae. It is found in Laos and Thailand.

== Description ==
Adults reach a length of about 3–4.5 mm (0.12–0.18 in). They have an elongate, slightly convex, glossy, light brown body, with the back of the head, the disc of the pronotum, the elytral suture, and a preapical spot on the elytra darker. The sides and apex of the elytra are pubescent.
