= Psammodius laevipennis =

Scientific classification
- Kingdom: Animalia
- Phylum: Arthropoda
- Clade: Pancrustacea
- Class: Insecta
- Order: Coleoptera
- Suborder: Polyphaga
- Infraorder: Scarabaeiformia
- Family: Scarabaeidae
- Genus: Psammodius
- Species: P. laevipennis

Binomial name
- Psammodius laevipennis Costa, 1844

Synonyms
- Psammodius scutellaris Mulsant & Wachanru, 1859; Psammodius ciliatus Küster, 1849; Psammodius aegialioides Haldeman, 1848; Psammodius rugicollis Erichson, 1848

Species of beetle

Psammodius laevipennis is a species of beetle of the family Scarabaeidae. It is found in Albania, Algeria, Azerbaijan, the Azores, Bosnia Herzegovina, Bulgaria, Croatia, Cyprus, France, Georgia, Greece (Crete), Hungary, Iran, Israel, Italy, Jordan, Lebanon, Macedonia, Morocco, Portugal, Romania, Serbia, Slovakia, Spain, Syria, Tunisia, Turkey and Ukraine. It was also introduced to North America, where it has been recorded from Canada (Ontario) and the United States (Indiana, Maryland, Virginia).

== Description ==
Adults reach a length of about 3–4.3 mm (0.12–0.17 in). They have an elongated, not strongly convex, glossy, blackish-brown body, with lighter-colored legs.
