= Gilletianus seqalu =

Scientific classification
- Kingdom: Animalia
- Phylum: Arthropoda
- Clade: Pancrustacea
- Class: Insecta
- Order: Coleoptera
- Suborder: Polyphaga
- Infraorder: Scarabaeiformia
- Family: Scarabaeidae
- Genus: Gilletianus
- Species: G. seqalu

Binomial name
- Gilletianus seqalu Ho & Král, 2025

Species of beetle

Gilletianus seqalu is a species of beetle of the family Scarabaeidae. It is found in Taiwan.

== Description ==
Adults reach a length of about 4.8–5.7 mm (0.19–0.22 in). They have a oblong-oval, weakly convex, shining body. The head and pronotum are glabrous, while the elytra are partly setaceous. They are brownish, with the margins of the clypeus, the basal and lateral margins of the pronotum, spots on the elytral disc, lateral margins and apex of the elytra and the legs paler.

== Etymology ==
The species name Seqalu is a name of an aboriginal people living mainly on the Hengchun peninsula in Taiwan, where the species was discovered.
