= Gilletianus timorensis =

Scientific classification
- Kingdom: Animalia
- Phylum: Arthropoda
- Clade: Pancrustacea
- Class: Insecta
- Order: Coleoptera
- Suborder: Polyphaga
- Infraorder: Scarabaeiformia
- Family: Scarabaeidae
- Genus: Gilletianus
- Species: G. timorensis

Binomial name
- Gilletianus timorensis Ochi, Kon & Kakizoe, 2016

Species of beetle

Gilletianus timorensis is a species of beetle of the family Scarabaeidae. It is found in Indonesia (Timor, Sumba).

== Description ==
Adults reach a length of about 4.1–4.5 mm (0.16–0.18 in). They have an elongate-oval, fairly strongly, brown to light brown convex. The head and pronotum are shining and glabrous, while the elytra are less shining and partly covered with short hairs.

== Etymology ==
The species is named after the type locality, Timor.
