= Gilletianus schoolmeestersi =

Scientific classification
- Kingdom: Animalia
- Phylum: Arthropoda
- Clade: Pancrustacea
- Class: Insecta
- Order: Coleoptera
- Suborder: Polyphaga
- Infraorder: Scarabaeiformia
- Family: Scarabaeidae
- Genus: Gilletianus
- Species: G. schoolmeestersi

Binomial name
- Gilletianus schoolmeestersi Ochi, Kon & Kakizoe, 2016

Species of beetle

Gilletianus schoolmeestersi is a species of beetle of the family Scarabaeidae. It is found in Indonesia (Mentawei).

== Description ==
Adults reach a length of about 4.6–5.1 mm (0.18–0.20 in). They have an elongate-oval, moderately convex, brown (but partly light brown) body. The head and pronotum are rather shining and glabrous, while the elytra are weakly shining or subopaque, and seemingly glabrous, but with tiny in the apical portion.

== Etymology ==
The species is named in honour of Mr. P. Schoolmeesters.
