= Gilletianus comatus =

Scientific classification
- Kingdom: Animalia
- Phylum: Arthropoda
- Clade: Pancrustacea
- Class: Insecta
- Order: Coleoptera
- Suborder: Polyphaga
- Infraorder: Scarabaeiformia
- Family: Scarabaeidae
- Genus: Gilletianus
- Species: G. comatus

Binomial name
- Gilletianus comatus (Schmidt, 1920)

Synonyms
- Aphodius (Trichaphodius) comatus Schmidt, 1920; Aphodius (Pharaphodius) chokaiensis Nomura & Nakane, 1951

Species of beetle

Gilletianus comatus is a species of beetle of the family Scarabaeidae. It is found in China (Fujian, Jilin, Liaoning), Japan, South Korea and the Russian Far East.

== Description ==
Adults reach a length of about 4–5.5 mm (0.16–0.22 in). They have an elongate-oval, strongly shiny, yellowish-red to black body, with the frons and part of the pronotum blackish-brown.

== Life history ==
Specimens have been collected from cow and human dung.
