= Melinopterus gissaricus =

Scientific classification
- Kingdom: Animalia
- Phylum: Arthropoda
- Clade: Pancrustacea
- Class: Insecta
- Order: Coleoptera
- Suborder: Polyphaga
- Infraorder: Scarabaeiformia
- Family: Scarabaeidae
- Genus: Melinopterus
- Species: M. gissaricus

Binomial name
- Melinopterus gissaricus (Akhmetova & Frolov, 2012)

Synonyms
- Aphodius (Melinopterus) gissaricus Akhmetova & Frolov, 2012

Species of beetle

Melinopterus gissaricus is a species of beetle of the family Scarabaeidae. It is found in Tajikistan.

== Description ==
Adults reach a length of about 4–5 mm (0.16–0.20 in). The dorsal surface is glossy. The head is light reddish-brown and the pronotum is light reddish-brown to light brown, with a yellowish lateral margins. The elytra are yellow-brown, with a light reddish-brown suture. The ventral surface and the legs are light yellow-brown.
