= Gilletianus kratochvili =

Scientific classification
- Kingdom: Animalia
- Phylum: Arthropoda
- Clade: Pancrustacea
- Class: Insecta
- Order: Coleoptera
- Suborder: Polyphaga
- Infraorder: Scarabaeiformia
- Family: Scarabaeidae
- Genus: Gilletianus
- Species: G. kratochvili

Binomial name
- Gilletianus kratochvili (Balthasar, 1941)

Synonyms
- Aphodius (Trichaphodius) kratochvili Balthasar, 1941; Aphodius (Trichaphodius) kratochvili concitator Balthasar, 1946

Species of beetle

Gilletianus kratochvili is a species of beetle of the family Scarabaeidae. It is found in China (Sichuan).

== Description ==
Adults reach a length of about 4–4.5 mm (0.16–0.18 in). They have a quite shiny, somewhat convex, light yellowish-brown body. Part of the head, the disc of the pronotum, and often the sutural interval, and a diffuse spot on the elytra are darker brown. There is a light mark before the apex of the elytra, which is bordered by a darker shade. The sides and apex of the elytra have fine, light hairs.
