= Brindalus =

Scientific classification
- Kingdom: Animalia
- Phylum: Arthropoda
- Clade: Pancrustacea
- Class: Insecta
- Order: Coleoptera
- Suborder: Polyphaga
- Infraorder: Scarabaeiformia
- Family: Scarabaeidae
- Subfamily: Aphodiinae
- Tribe: Psammodiini
- Genus: Brindalus; Landin, 1960

Genus of beetles

Brindalus is a genus of beetles of the family Scarabaeidae.

== Species ==
- Brindalus granulicollis (Pittino, 1980)
- Brindalus maderae (Pittino, 1983)
- Brindalus porcicollis (Illiger, 1803)
- Brindalus rotundipennis (Reitter, 1892)
- Brindalus schatzmayri (Pittino, 1980)
