= Psammodius flavolittoralis =

Scientific classification
- Kingdom: Animalia
- Phylum: Arthropoda
- Clade: Pancrustacea
- Class: Insecta
- Order: Coleoptera
- Suborder: Polyphaga
- Infraorder: Scarabaeiformia
- Family: Scarabaeidae
- Genus: Psammodius
- Species: P. flavolittoralis

Binomial name
- Psammodius flavolittoralis Kim, 1980

Species of beetle

Psammodius flavolittoralis is a species of beetle of the family Scarabaeidae. It is found in Korea.

== Description ==
Adults reach a length of about 2.5–3.5 mm (0.098–0.138 in). They have a weakly elongate, spherical, weakly shiny, yellowish-brown body.
