= Melinopterus abeillei =

Scientific classification
- Kingdom: Animalia
- Phylum: Arthropoda
- Clade: Pancrustacea
- Class: Insecta
- Order: Coleoptera
- Suborder: Polyphaga
- Infraorder: Scarabaeiformia
- Family: Scarabaeidae
- Genus: Melinopterus
- Species: M. abeillei

Binomial name
- Melinopterus abeillei (Sietti, 1903)

Synonyms
- Aphodius (Melinopterus) abeillei Sietti, 1903; Aphodius (Melinopterus) dissimilis Petrovitz, 1968

Species of beetle

Melinopterus abeillei is a species of beetle of the family Scarabaeidae. It is found in Algeria, Morocco, Portugal, Spain and Tunesia.

== Description ==
Adults reach a length of about 4–7 mm (0.16–0.28 in). The head is black, with the sides sometimes lighter. The pronotum is black, with yellowish sides and the elytra have a dark suture and a light-brown spot. In males, the elytra have short setae, while the elytra of the females either have very short hairs in the apical third or are entirely glabrous.
