= Gilletianus =

Scientific classification
- Kingdom: Animalia
- Phylum: Arthropoda
- Clade: Pancrustacea
- Class: Insecta
- Order: Coleoptera
- Suborder: Polyphaga
- Infraorder: Scarabaeiformia
- Family: Scarabaeidae
- Subfamily: Aphodiinae
- Tribe: Aphodiini
- Genus: Gilletianus; Balthasar, 1933

Synonyms
- Aphodius (Gilletianus) Balthasar, 1933

Genus of beetles

Gilletianus is a genus of beetles of the family Scarabaeidae.

== Species ==
- Gilletianus aganocrossoides Král, Rakovič & Mencl, 2014
- Gilletianus asinensis Ochi, Kon & Kakizoe, 2016
- Gilletianus assamensis (Petrovitz, 1976)
- Gilletianus atsushii (Ochi, 1986)
- Gilletianus banteng Král & Masumoto, 2020
- Gilletianus bolm Král, Rakovič & Mencl, 2014
- Gilletianus cavitensis Ochi, Kon & Kakizoe, 2016
- Gilletianus comatus (Schmidt, 1920)
- Gilletianus commatoides (Balthasar, 1961)
- Gilletianus costatulus (Schmidt, 1908)
- Gilletianus fukiensis (Balthasar, 1952)
- Gilletianus imasakai Ochi, Kon & Kakizoe, 2016
- Gilletianus kanchil Král & Masumoto, 2020
- Gilletianus kazirangensis (Stebnicka, 1981)
- Gilletianus kinabuhayan Ochi, Kon & Kakizoe, 2016
- Gilletianus kratochvili (Balthasar, 1941)
- Gilletianus lomsakensis (Stebnicka, 1992)
- Gilletianus luzonensis Ochi, Kon & Kakizoe, 2016
- Gilletianus matotomensis Ochi, Kon & Kawahara, 2010
- Gilletianus miksici (Balthasar, 1960)
- Gilletianus mindorensis Ochi, Kon & Kawahara, 2010
- Gilletianus miurai Minkina, 2022
- Gilletianus negrosensis Ochi, Kon & Kakizoe, 2016
- Gilletianus nigrovirgatus (Schmidt, 1910)
- Gilletianus poggii Ochi, Kon & Kawahara, 2014
- Gilletianus proclivis (Balthasar, 1933)
- Gilletianus pseudoreichei (Stebnicka, 1998)
- Gilletianus rajawatorum (Král & Sipek, 2013)
- Gilletianus rangoonensis (Petrovitz, 1970)
- Gilletianus reichei (Harold, 1859)
- Gilletianus schoolmeestersi Ochi, Kon & Kakizoe, 2016
- Gilletianus segmentarius (Harold, 1879)
- Gilletianus segmentaroides (Schmidt, 1909)
- Gilletianus seguyi (Paulian, 1945)
- Gilletianus seqalu Ho & Král, 2025
- Gilletianus sundainsulanus Ochi, Kon & Kawahara, 2014
- Gilletianus superreichei Ochi, Kon & Kawahara, 2010
- Gilletianus takeshii Ochi, Kon & Kawahara, 2010
- Gilletianus therondi (Balthasar, 1963)
- Gilletianus timorensis Ochi, Kon & Kakizoe, 2016
- Gilletianus tonkineus (Paulian, 1933)
- Gilletianus yunnanensis Král, Rakovič & Mencl, 2015
