= Melinopterus longipes =

Scientific classification
- Kingdom: Animalia
- Phylum: Arthropoda
- Clade: Pancrustacea
- Class: Insecta
- Order: Coleoptera
- Suborder: Polyphaga
- Infraorder: Scarabaeiformia
- Family: Scarabaeidae
- Genus: Melinopterus
- Species: M. longipes

Binomial name
- Melinopterus longipes (Landin, 1949)

Synonyms
- Aphodius longipes Landin, 1949

Species of beetle

Melinopterus longipes is a species of beetle of the family Scarabaeidae. It is found in Thailand.

== Taxonomy ==
The placement of this species in Melinopterus has been questioned by Rössner in 2018, since the genus is thought to be limited to the Palearctic and Nearctic regions.
