= Paracrossidius transmontanus =

Scientific classification
- Kingdom: Animalia
- Phylum: Arthropoda
- Clade: Pancrustacea
- Class: Insecta
- Order: Coleoptera
- Suborder: Polyphaga
- Infraorder: Scarabaeiformia
- Family: Scarabaeidae
- Genus: Paracrossidius
- Species: P. transmontanus

Binomial name
- Paracrossidius transmontanus (Balthasar, 1932)

Synonyms
- Aphodius (Acrossus) viturati transmontanus Balthasar, 1932

Species of beetle

Paracrossidius transmontanus is a species of beetle of the family Scarabaeidae. It is found in China (Sichuan, Chongqing).

== Description ==
Adults reach a length of about 8.7–11.4 mm (0.34–0.45 in). The head and pronotum are black, shiny and glabrous, while the elytra are yellowish-brown with a darkened suture. The elytra are shiny and glabrous at the base, but dull and covered with yellowish hairs elsewhere. The club of the antennae is black.
