= Gilletianus segmentaroides =

Scientific classification
- Kingdom: Animalia
- Phylum: Arthropoda
- Clade: Pancrustacea
- Class: Insecta
- Order: Coleoptera
- Suborder: Polyphaga
- Infraorder: Scarabaeiformia
- Family: Scarabaeidae
- Genus: Gilletianus
- Species: G. segmentaroides

Binomial name
- Gilletianus segmentaroides (Schmidt, 1909)

Synonyms
- Aphodius segmentaroides Schmidt, 1909

Species of beetle

Gilletianus segmentaroides is a species of beetle of the family Scarabaeidae. It is found in India (Karnataka, Rajasthan, Uttarakhand), Laos, Myanmar, Thailand, Vietnam and Taiwan.

== Description ==
Adults reach a length of about 4–5.5 mm (0.16–0.22 in). They have a quite convex, almost glossy, light to dark brown body. The anterior margin of the head, the anterior angles of the pronotum, and often also the tips of the elytra are lighter. There is a pale preapical spot with a dark border. The elytra are pubescent toward the rear and along the sides.
