= Gilletianus fukiensis =

Scientific classification
- Kingdom: Animalia
- Phylum: Arthropoda
- Clade: Pancrustacea
- Class: Insecta
- Order: Coleoptera
- Suborder: Polyphaga
- Infraorder: Scarabaeiformia
- Family: Scarabaeidae
- Genus: Gilletianus
- Species: G. fukiensis

Binomial name
- Gilletianus fukiensis (Balthasar, 1952)

Synonyms
- Aphodius (Trichaphodius) fukiensis Balthasar, 1952

Species of beetle

Gilletianus fukiensis is a species of beetle of the family Scarabaeidae. It is found in China (Fujian) and Thailand.

== Description ==
Adults reach a length of about 4–4.5 mm (0.16–0.18 in). They have a moderately convex body. The forebody is glossy, while the elytra are somewhat dull. The colour ranges from yellow-brown to chestnut-brown, with part of the head and the disc of the pronotum slightly darker. There is a faint preapical spot on the elytra and the elytra have very short pubescence along the sides and at the apex.
