= Melinopterus guillebeaui =

Scientific classification
- Kingdom: Animalia
- Phylum: Arthropoda
- Clade: Pancrustacea
- Class: Insecta
- Order: Coleoptera
- Suborder: Polyphaga
- Infraorder: Scarabaeiformia
- Family: Scarabaeidae
- Genus: Melinopterus
- Species: M. guillebeaui

Binomial name
- Melinopterus guillebeaui (Reitter, 1891)

Synonyms
- Aphodius (Melinopterus) guillebeaui Reitter, 1891; Aphodius pectoralis Guillebeau, 1888

Species of beetle

Melinopterus guillebeaui is a species of beetle of the family Scarabaeidae. It is found in southern France.

== Description ==
Adults reach a length of about 5–6 mm (0.20–0.24 in). The head is black with lighter brown sides. The pronotum is black with yellowish sides and the elytra have a dark suture and a light to dark brown spot. Males have distinct pubescence on the elytra, with only the base glabrous. In females, the hairs are shorter and are only found on the sides and the apical third of the elytra.
