= Gilletianus negrosensis =

Scientific classification
- Kingdom: Animalia
- Phylum: Arthropoda
- Clade: Pancrustacea
- Class: Insecta
- Order: Coleoptera
- Suborder: Polyphaga
- Infraorder: Scarabaeiformia
- Family: Scarabaeidae
- Genus: Gilletianus
- Species: G. negrosensis

Binomial name
- Gilletianus negrosensis Ochi, Kon & Kakizoe, 2016

Species of beetle

Gilletianus negrosensis is a species of beetle of the family Scarabaeidae. It is found in the Philippines (Negros).

== Description ==
Adults reach a length of about 4.2–4.8 mm (0.17–0.19 in). They have an elongate-oval, moderately convex, light brown to brown body. The head and pronotum are shining and glabrous, while the elytra are slightly shining and covered with short fine hairs.

== Etymology ==
The species name refers to the type locality, Negros.
