= Melinopterus villarreali =

Scientific classification
- Kingdom: Animalia
- Phylum: Arthropoda
- Clade: Pancrustacea
- Class: Insecta
- Order: Coleoptera
- Suborder: Polyphaga
- Infraorder: Scarabaeiformia
- Family: Scarabaeidae
- Genus: Melinopterus
- Species: M. villarreali

Binomial name
- Melinopterus villarreali (Baraud, 1975)

Synonyms
- Aphodius (Melinopterus) villarreali Baraud, 1975

Species of beetle

Melinopterus villarreali is a species of beetle of the family Scarabaeidae. It is found in Morocco, Portugal and Spain.

== Description ==
Adults reach a length of about 4.5 mm. The head is black, with a well-defined, orbicular yellow spot on each side of the clypeus. The pronotum is black, bordered with testaceous broadly along the sides and narrowly along the base. The scutellum is black and the elytra are testaceous with a large nebulous spot on the disc. The underside is black and the legs are testaceous.
