= Melinopterus makowskyi =

Scientific classification
- Kingdom: Animalia
- Phylum: Arthropoda
- Clade: Pancrustacea
- Class: Insecta
- Order: Coleoptera
- Suborder: Polyphaga
- Infraorder: Scarabaeiformia
- Family: Scarabaeidae
- Genus: Melinopterus
- Species: M. makowskyi

Binomial name
- Melinopterus makowskyi (Koshantschikov, 1891)

Synonyms
- Aphodius makowskyi Koshantschikov, 1891

Species of beetle

Melinopterus makowskyi is a species of beetle of the family Scarabaeidae. It is found in Kazakhstan, Kyrgyzstan and Turkmenistan.

== Description ==
Adults reach a length of about 4–6 mm (0.16–0.24 in). The dorsal surface is glossy. The head is black, with anterior margin bordered with brown. The pronotum is black, with yellowish lateral margins and the elytra are yellowish-brown, with a darkened suture and a pattern of brown markings. The ventral surface is blackish-brown to black, with the legs light brown.
