= Melinopterus femoralis =

Scientific classification
- Kingdom: Animalia
- Phylum: Arthropoda
- Clade: Pancrustacea
- Class: Insecta
- Order: Coleoptera
- Suborder: Polyphaga
- Infraorder: Scarabaeiformia
- Family: Scarabaeidae
- Genus: Melinopterus
- Species: M. femoralis

Binomial name
- Melinopterus femoralis (Say, 1823)

Synonyms
- Aphodius femoralis Say, 1823; Aphodius (Melinopterus) meuseli Reitter, 1906

Species of beetle

Melinopterus femoralis is a species of beetle of the family Scarabaeidae. It is found in Canada (Ontario, Quebec), the United States (Arizona, Arkansas, Colorado, Georgia, Indiana, Iowa, Kansas, Maryland, Michigan, Missouri, Montana, Nebraska, North Dakota, Pennsylvania, South Carolina, South Dakota, Tennessee, Texas) and Russia (Siberia).

== Description ==
Adults reach a length of about 4.4–6.4 mm (0.17–0.25 in). The forebody is glossy, while the elytra range from weakly glossy to dull. The head and pronotum are black-brown to black, the latter with yellowish sides. The elytra are yellowish-brown, with the suture darkened and with a brown patch. The underside is dark brown and the legs are reddish-brown to yellowish-brown.
