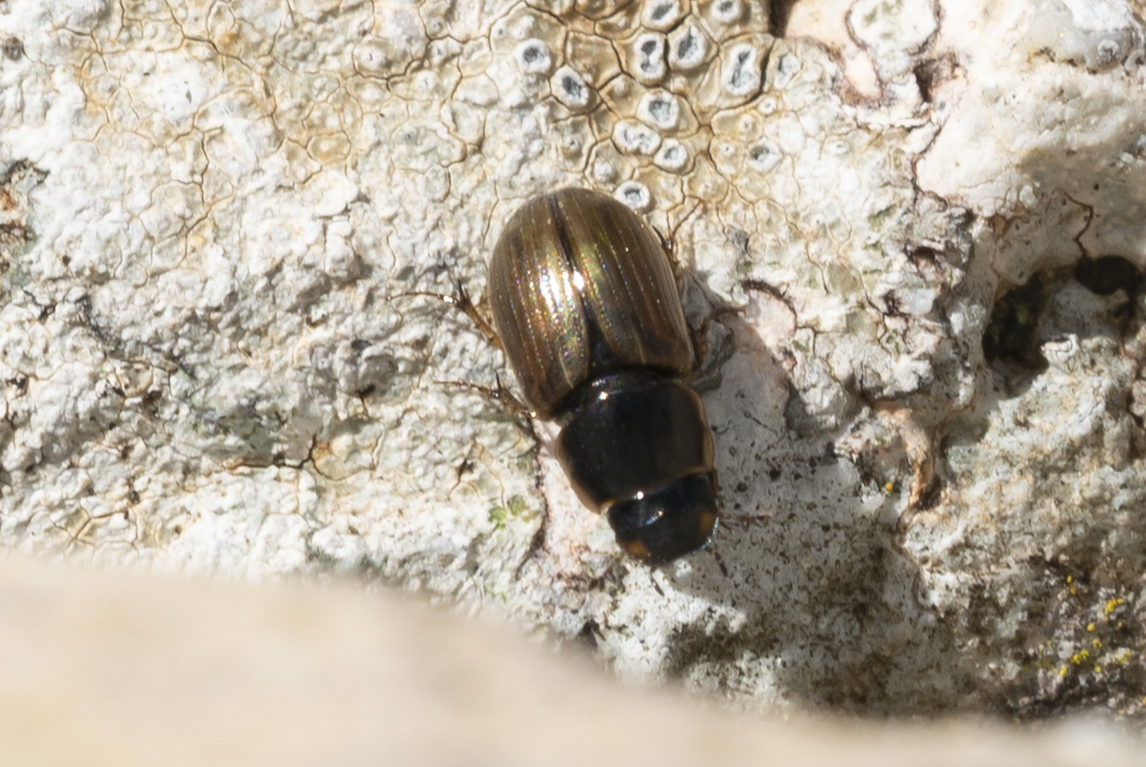
- Melinopterus consputus, Greece

Scientific classification
- Kingdom: Animalia
- Phylum: Arthropoda
- Clade: Pancrustacea
- Class: Insecta
- Order: Coleoptera
- Suborder: Polyphaga
- Infraorder: Scarabaeiformia
- Family: Scarabaeidae
- Subfamily: Aphodiinae
- Tribe: Aphodiini
- Genus: Melinopterus
- Species: M. consputus

Binomial name
- Melinopterus consputus (Creutzer, 1799)

Synonyms
- Aphodius consputus Creutzer, 1799; Aphodius (Nobius) diens Balthasar, 1946; Aphodius (Volinus) xanthopterus Balthasar, 1938; Aphodius (Melinopterus) consputus mauca Dalla Torre, 1879; Aphodius (Melinopterus) consputus obsoleta Dalla Torre, 1879; Aphodius coriarius Gistel, 1857; Aphodius consputus impunctatus Mulsant, 1842; Aphodius consputus mendicus Mulsant, 1842; Aphodius consputus metallescens Mulsant, 1842; Aphodius griseus Schmidt, 1840

= Melinopterus consputus =

Species of scarab beetle

Melinopterus consputus is a species of scarab beetle in the family Scarabaeidae, found in the Palearctic, where it has been recorded from Albania, Algeria, Armenia, Austria, Belgium, Bosnia and Herzegovina, Bulgaria, Croatia, Czech Republic, France, Georgia, Germany, Great Britain, Greece, Hungary, Iran, Italy, Jordan, Latvia, Lebanon, Lithuania, Malta, Montenegro, Morocco, the Netherlands, Poland, Portugal, Romania, Russia, Serbia, Slovakia, Slovenia, Spain, Switzerland, Syria, Tunisia, Turkey and Ukraine. The species is considered endangered in Germany.

== Description ==
Adults reach a length of about 3–5 mm (0.12–0.20 in). They have a shiny body. The forebody is black, with the sides of the head, sides of the pronotum, elytra and legs yellowish-brown. The elytra have a diffuse brown spot.
