= Paracrossidius instigator =

Scientific classification
- Kingdom: Animalia
- Phylum: Arthropoda
- Clade: Pancrustacea
- Class: Insecta
- Order: Coleoptera
- Suborder: Polyphaga
- Infraorder: Scarabaeiformia
- Family: Scarabaeidae
- Genus: Paracrossidius
- Species: P. instigator

Binomial name
- Paracrossidius instigator (Balthasar, 1932)

Synonyms
- Aphodius (Paracrossidius) instigator Balthasar, 1932

Species of beetle

Paracrossidius instigator is a species of beetle of the family Scarabaeidae. It is found in China (Qinghai, Sichuan).

== Description ==
Adults reach a length of about 6–7 mm (0.24–0.28 in). They have an oval-elongate, feebly convex, rather shiny, glabrous body, although the elytra have some short hairs toward the apex. They are piceous, with the front angles of the pronotum, as well as the shoulders and lateral margins of the elytra brown-yellowish. The legs are brownish and the antennal club is piceous.
