= Melinopterus maroccanus =

Scientific classification
- Kingdom: Animalia
- Phylum: Arthropoda
- Clade: Pancrustacea
- Class: Insecta
- Order: Coleoptera
- Suborder: Polyphaga
- Infraorder: Scarabaeiformia
- Family: Scarabaeidae
- Genus: Melinopterus
- Species: M. maroccanus

Binomial name
- Melinopterus maroccanus Rössner, 2018

Synonyms
- Melinopterus sphacelatus marroccanus Rössner, 2018

Species of beetle

Melinopterus maroccanus is a species of beetle of the family Scarabaeidae. It is found in Morocco.

== Description ==
Adults reach a length of about 4.5–7 mm (0.18–0.28 in). The head is black, sometimes with narrow brown lateral margins. The pronotum is black, with yellowish lateral margins and the scutellum is black. The elytra are brownish-yellow with a dark suture and a brown, cloudy spot.
