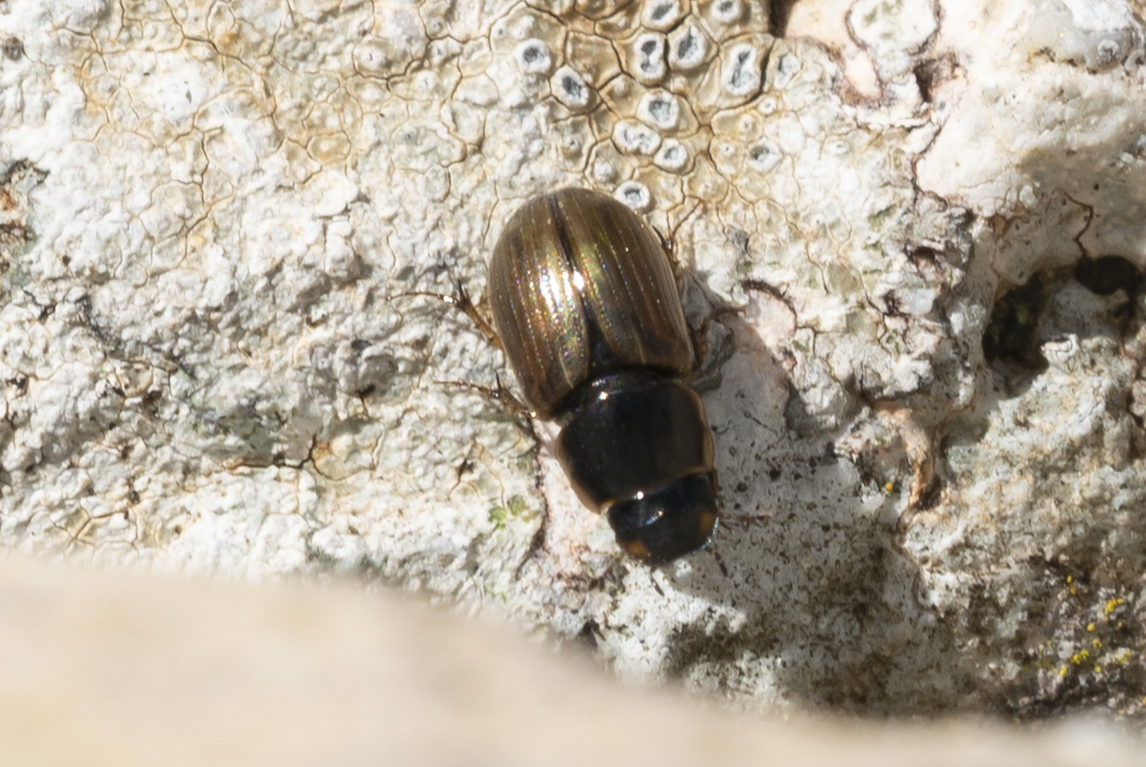
- Melinopterus consputus, Greece

Scientific classification
- Kingdom: Animalia
- Phylum: Arthropoda
- Clade: Pancrustacea
- Class: Insecta
- Order: Coleoptera
- Suborder: Polyphaga
- Infraorder: Scarabaeiformia
- Family: Scarabaeidae
- Subfamily: Aphodiinae
- Tribe: Aphodiini
- Genus: Melinopterus; Mulsant, 1842

= Melinopterus =

Genus of beetles

Melinopterus is a genus of scarab beetles in the family Scarabaeidae. There are more than 20 described species in Melinopterus.

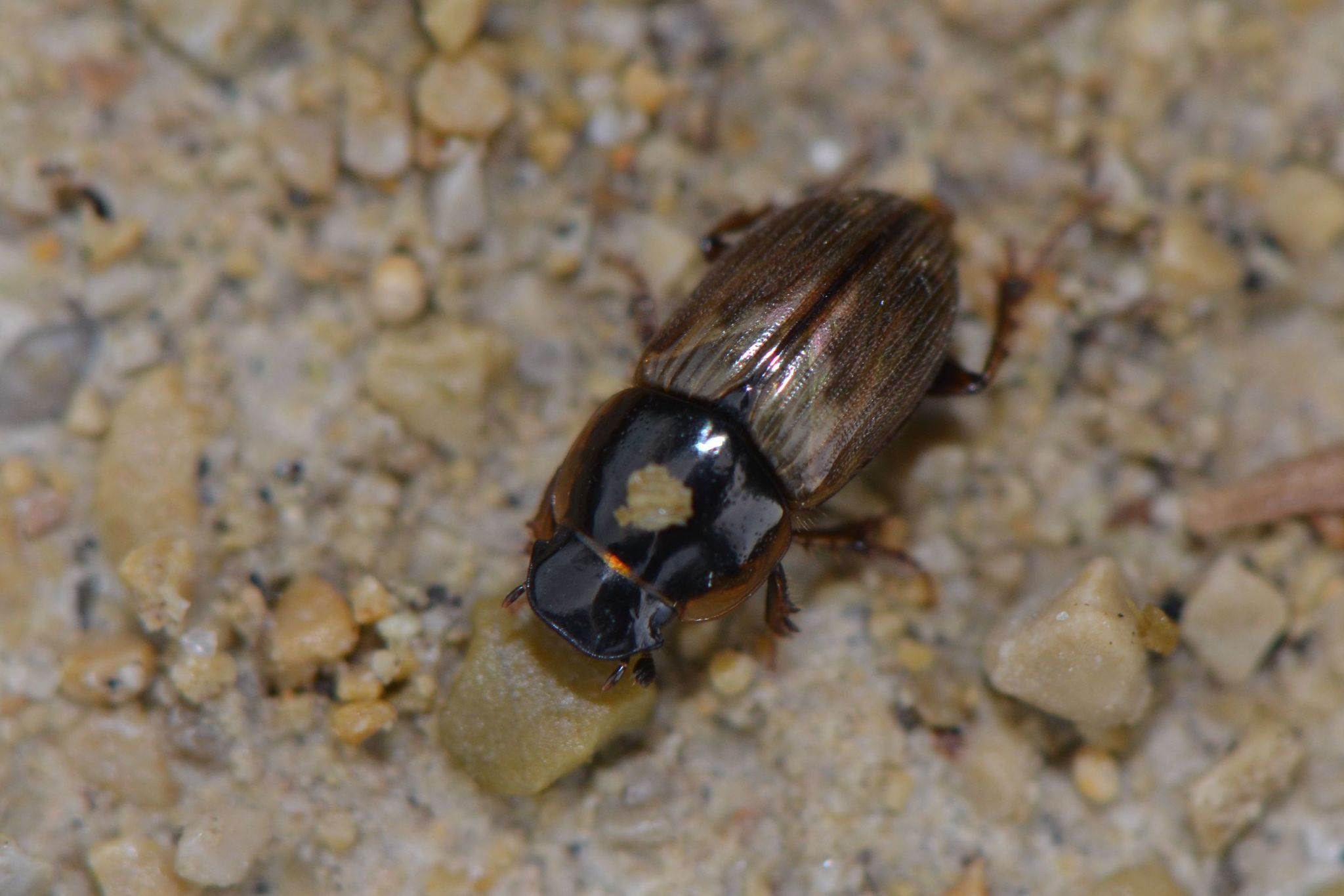
Melinopterus prodromus, Switzerland

== Species ==
These 22 species belong to the genus Melinopterus. Some of these were previously members of the genus Aphodius.

- Melinopterus abeillei (Sietti, 1903)
- Melinopterus consputus (Creutzer, 1799)
- Melinopterus femoralis (Say, 1823)
- Melinopterus feryi Rössner, 2018
- Melinopterus gissaricus (Akhmetova & Frolov, 2012)
- Melinopterus guillebeaui (Reitter, 1891)
- Melinopterus imamae (Stebnicka, 1988)
- Melinopterus longipes (Landin, 1949)
- Melinopterus makowskyi (Koshantschikov, 1891)
- Melinopterus maroccanus Rössner, 2018
- Melinopterus prodromus (Brahm, 1790)
- Melinopterus pubescens (Sturm, 1800)
- Melinopterus punctatosulcatus (Sturm, 1805)
- Melinopterus rapax (Faldermann, 1836)
- Melinopterus reyi (Reitter, 1892)
- Melinopterus scuticollis (Semenov, 1898)
- Melinopterus sertavulensis (Pittino, 1988)
- Melinopterus sphacelatus (Panzer, 1798)
- Melinopterus stolzi (Reitter, 1906)
- Melinopterus tingens (Reitter, 1892)
- Melinopterus villarreali (Baraud, 1975)
- Melinopterus wittmeri (Petrovitz, 1975)
