= Coptochiroides subcostatus =

Scientific classification
- Kingdom: Animalia
- Phylum: Arthropoda
- Clade: Pancrustacea
- Class: Insecta
- Order: Coleoptera
- Suborder: Polyphaga
- Infraorder: Scarabaeiformia
- Family: Scarabaeidae
- Genus: Coptochiroides
- Species: C. subcostatus

Binomial name
- Coptochiroides subcostatus (Kolbe, 1886)

Synonyms
- Aphodius subcostatus Kolbe, 1886; Pharaphodius subcostatus perroti Paulian, 1945; Aphodius (Coptochiroides) guntherschmidti Balthasar, 1938

Species of beetle

Coptochiroides subcostatus is a species of beetle of the family Scarabaeidae. It is found in Japan, Korea, the Russian Far East, Taiwan, China (Sichuan, Yunnan) and Vietnam.

== Description ==
Adults reach a length of about 4–5 mm (0.16–0.20 in). They have an oval-elongate, moderately convex, shiny, glabrous, pale brownish body. The front, disc of the pronotum, elytral suture and lateral margins are dark brown.

== Subspecies ==
- Coptochiroides subcostatus subcostatus (Japan, Korea, Russian Far East, Taiwan, China: Sichuan, Yunnan)
- Coptochiroides subcostatus perroti (Paulian, 1945) (Vietnam)
