= Psammodius sefrensis =

Scientific classification
- Kingdom: Animalia
- Phylum: Arthropoda
- Clade: Pancrustacea
- Class: Insecta
- Order: Coleoptera
- Suborder: Polyphaga
- Infraorder: Scarabaeiformia
- Family: Scarabaeidae
- Genus: Psammodius
- Species: P. sefrensis

Binomial name
- Psammodius sefrensis (Petrovitz, 1961)

Synonyms
- Psammobius sefrensis Petrovitz, 1961

Species of beetle

Psammodius sefrensis is a species of beetle of the family Scarabaeidae. It is found in Algeria and Tunisia.

== Description ==
Adults reach a length of about 3.5–4 mm (0.14–0.16 in). They have a glossy, reddish-brown body.
