= Gilletianus nigrovirgatus =

Scientific classification
- Kingdom: Animalia
- Phylum: Arthropoda
- Clade: Pancrustacea
- Class: Insecta
- Order: Coleoptera
- Suborder: Polyphaga
- Infraorder: Scarabaeiformia
- Family: Scarabaeidae
- Genus: Gilletianus
- Species: G. nigrovirgatus

Binomial name
- Gilletianus nigrovirgatus (Schmidt, 1910)

Synonyms
- Aphodius nigrovirgatus Schmidt, 1910; Aphodius nigrosulcatus Schmidt, 1909

Species of beetle

Gilletianus nigrovirgatus is a species of beetle of the family Scarabaeidae. It is found in China (Yunnan), Nepal, India (Uttar Pradesh), Indonesia (Sulawesi), Laos, the Philippines and Thailand.

== Description ==
Adults reach a length of about 4–5 mm (0.16–0.20 in). They have a slightly convex, somewhat shiny, light brown body, with the back of the head, the disc of the pronotum, the sutural interval and the striae of the elytra dark brown. In males, the elytra are almost completely pubescent, while in females, the elytra are pubescent along the sides and in the apical region only.
