= Psammodius convexus =

Scientific classification
- Kingdom: Animalia
- Phylum: Arthropoda
- Clade: Pancrustacea
- Class: Insecta
- Order: Coleoptera
- Suborder: Polyphaga
- Infraorder: Scarabaeiformia
- Family: Scarabaeidae
- Genus: Psammodius
- Species: P. convexus

Binomial name
- Psammodius convexus Waterhouse, 1875

Species of beetle

Psammodius convexus is a species of beetle of the family Scarabaeidae. It is found in China (Ningxia), Japan and the Russian Far East.

== Description ==
Adults reach a length of about 3–3.5 mm (0.12–0.14 in). They have a glossy, strongly convex, dark chestnut-brown body.
