= Paracrossidius impressiusculus =

Scientific classification
- Kingdom: Animalia
- Phylum: Arthropoda
- Clade: Pancrustacea
- Class: Insecta
- Order: Coleoptera
- Suborder: Polyphaga
- Infraorder: Scarabaeiformia
- Family: Scarabaeidae
- Genus: Paracrossidius
- Species: P. impressiusculus

Binomial name
- Paracrossidius impressiusculus (Fairmaire, 1888)

Synonyms
- Aphodius (Acrossus) impressiusculus Fairmaire, 1888; Aphodius (Acrossus) viturati contubernalis Balthasar, 1932; Aphodius (Platyderides) impressicollis Boucomont, 1929; Aphodius (Acrossus) viturati Reitter, 1907

Species of beetle

Paracrossidius impressiusculus is a species of beetle of the family Scarabaeidae. It is found in China (Ningxia, Sichuan, Xinjiang) and Nepal.

== Description ==
Adults reach a length of about 6.5–7.5 mm (0.26–0.30 in). They have a slightly convex body, with the head and pronotum black and mostly glossy. The elytra are dark brown.
