= Melinopterus feryi =

Scientific classification
- Kingdom: Animalia
- Phylum: Arthropoda
- Clade: Pancrustacea
- Class: Insecta
- Order: Coleoptera
- Suborder: Polyphaga
- Infraorder: Scarabaeiformia
- Family: Scarabaeidae
- Genus: Melinopterus
- Species: M. feryi

Binomial name
- Melinopterus feryi Rössner, 2018

Species of beetle

Melinopterus feryi is a species of beetle of the family Scarabaeidae. It is found in Morocco.

== Description ==
Adults reach a length of about 5.1–7.2 mm (0.20–0.28 in). They have a moderately shiny body. The forebody is black, while the lateral and anterior margins of the head, sides and base of the pronotum, elytra and legs are light yellowish-brown. The elytra also have a diffuse brown spot.

== Etymology ==
The species is named in honour of Dytiscidae specialist Hans Fery, who collected the type series.
