= Paracrossidius truculentus =

Scientific classification
- Kingdom: Animalia
- Phylum: Arthropoda
- Clade: Pancrustacea
- Class: Insecta
- Order: Coleoptera
- Suborder: Polyphaga
- Infraorder: Scarabaeiformia
- Family: Scarabaeidae
- Genus: Paracrossidius
- Species: P. truculentus

Binomial name
- Paracrossidius truculentus (Balthasar, 1963)

Synonyms
- Aphodius (Platyderides) truculentus Balthasar, 1963

Species of beetle

Paracrossidius truculentus is a species of beetle of the family Scarabaeidae. It is found in China (Qinghai, Sichuan, Xizang).

== Description ==
Adults reach a length of about 6.5–7.5 mm (0.26–0.30 in). They have an elongate-oval, convex body, with the head and pronotum black and glossy, while the elytra are quite glossy anteriorly, but almost dull posteriorly and completely dull in the apical third. The elytra are black or blackish-brown.
