= Gilletianus miksici =

Scientific classification
- Kingdom: Animalia
- Phylum: Arthropoda
- Clade: Pancrustacea
- Class: Insecta
- Order: Coleoptera
- Suborder: Polyphaga
- Infraorder: Scarabaeiformia
- Family: Scarabaeidae
- Genus: Gilletianus
- Species: G. miksici

Binomial name
- Gilletianus miksici (Balthasar, 1960)

Synonyms
- Aphodius (Trichaphodius) miksici Balthasar, 1960

Species of beetle

Gilletianus miksici is a species of beetle of the family Scarabaeidae. It is found in Indonesia (Java), Malaysia, Thailand and Vietnam.

== Description ==
Adults reach a length of about 3.8–4 mm (0.15–0.16 in). They have an elongate-oval, strongly convex, glossy, dirty yellow body, with part of the head and the disc of the pronotum darker. The elytra have a darkened sutural area and a pale pre-apical spot. The tip of the elytra is lighter. The tip t and the sides of the elytra are covered with light-colored hairs.
