= Gilletianus kinabuhayan =

Scientific classification
- Kingdom: Animalia
- Phylum: Arthropoda
- Clade: Pancrustacea
- Class: Insecta
- Order: Coleoptera
- Suborder: Polyphaga
- Infraorder: Scarabaeiformia
- Family: Scarabaeidae
- Genus: Gilletianus
- Species: G. kinabuhayan

Binomial name
- Gilletianus kinabuhayan Ochi, Kon & Kakizoe, 2016

Species of beetle

Gilletianus kinabuhayan is a species of beetle of the family Scarabaeidae. It is found in the Philippines (Luzon).

== Description ==
Adults reach a length of about 4–4.9 mm (0.16–0.19 in). They have an elongate-oval, moderately convex, light brown to brown body. The head and pronotum are weakly shining and glabrous, while the elytra are weakly shining and covered with short fine hairs in apical half.

== Subspecies ==
- Gilletianus kinabuhayan kinabuhayan (Philippines: Luzon)
- Gilletianus kinabuhayan lucenaensis Ochi, Kon & Kakizoe, 2016 (Philippines: Luzon)

== Etymology ==
The species name refers to the type locality, Kinabuhayan.
