= Bodilopsis ogloblini =

Scientific classification
- Kingdom: Animalia
- Phylum: Arthropoda
- Clade: Pancrustacea
- Class: Insecta
- Order: Coleoptera
- Suborder: Polyphaga
- Infraorder: Scarabaeiformia
- Family: Scarabaeidae
- Genus: Bodilopsis
- Species: B. ogloblini

Binomial name
- Bodilopsis ogloblini (Semenov & Medvedev, 1928)

Synonyms
- Aphodius (Mendidius) ogloblini Semenov & Medvedev, 1928

Species of beetle

Bodilopsis ogloblini is a species of beetle of the family Scarabaeidae. It is found in Azerbaijan, Russia and Turkmenistan.

== Description ==
Adults reach a length of about 6–6.5 mm (0.24–0.26 in). They have a moderately glossy, rather strongly convex, glabrous, blackish-brown body. The front of the head and the sides of the pronotum are slightly translucent. The scutellum is brown and the elytra are yellowish-brown, with a darkened suture. The legs are brown.
