= Psammodius hangangnensis =

Scientific classification
- Kingdom: Animalia
- Phylum: Arthropoda
- Clade: Pancrustacea
- Class: Insecta
- Order: Coleoptera
- Suborder: Polyphaga
- Infraorder: Scarabaeiformia
- Family: Scarabaeidae
- Genus: Psammodius
- Species: P. hangangnensis

Binomial name
- Psammodius hangangnensis Kim, 1980

Species of beetle

Psammodius hangangnensis is a species of beetle of the family Scarabaeidae. It is found in Korea.

== Description ==
Adults reach a length of about 2.6–3 mm (0.10–0.12 in). They have a spherical, strongly shiny, reddish-brown body, with the mouthparts, antennae and ventral surface yellowish-brown.
