= Melinopterus reyi =

Scientific classification
- Kingdom: Animalia
- Phylum: Arthropoda
- Clade: Pancrustacea
- Class: Insecta
- Order: Coleoptera
- Suborder: Polyphaga
- Infraorder: Scarabaeiformia
- Family: Scarabaeidae
- Genus: Melinopterus
- Species: M. reyi

Binomial name
- Melinopterus reyi (Reitter, 1892)

Synonyms
- Aphodius (Melinopterus) reyi Reitter, 1892; Aphodius (Melinopterus) edithae Reitter, 1906; Aphodius pubescens nebulosus Schilsky, 1888

Species of beetle

Melinopterus reyi is a species of beetle of the family Scarabaeidae. It is found in Albania, Armenia, Austria, Bosnia Herzegovina, Bulgaria, the Czech Republic, Denmark, France, Georgia, Germany, Greece, Hungary, Italy, Luxembourg, Montenegro, the Netherlands, Poland, Portugal, Romania, Russia, Serbia, Spain, Slovakia, Switzerland, Turkey and Ukraine.

== Description ==
Adults reach a length of about 4–6 mm (0.16–0.24 in). They have a somewhat stout body. The head is black with the lateral margins, and sometimes the anterior margin, yellowish-brown to reddish-yellow. The pronotum is blackish-brown to black, with yellowish lateral margins and the elytra are yellowish-brown with a dark suture and a light brown spot.
