= Gilletianus yunnanensis =

Scientific classification
- Kingdom: Animalia
- Phylum: Arthropoda
- Clade: Pancrustacea
- Class: Insecta
- Order: Coleoptera
- Suborder: Polyphaga
- Infraorder: Scarabaeiformia
- Family: Scarabaeidae
- Genus: Gilletianus
- Species: G. yunnanensis

Binomial name
- Gilletianus yunnanensis Král, Rakovič & Mencl, 2015

Species of beetle

Gilletianus yunnanensis is a species of beetle of the family Scarabaeidae. It is found in China (Yunnan).

== Description ==
Adults reach a length of about 4.6–5.5 mm (0.18–0.22 in). They have an oblong-oval, convex, shining, brown body. The head and pronotum are glabrous, while the elytra are setaceous. The margins of the clypeus, basal and lateral margins of the pronotum, spots on the disc of the elytra, as well as the lateral margins and apex of the elytra and the legs are all yellowish.

== Life history ==
Specimens have been collected from cow dung.

== Etymology ==
The species name is derived from the name of the Chinese Province of Yunnan, where the species was first collected.
