= Gilletianus commatoides =

Scientific classification
- Kingdom: Animalia
- Phylum: Arthropoda
- Clade: Pancrustacea
- Class: Insecta
- Order: Coleoptera
- Suborder: Polyphaga
- Infraorder: Scarabaeiformia
- Family: Scarabaeidae
- Genus: Gilletianus
- Species: G. commatoides

Binomial name
- Gilletianus commatoides (Balthasar, 1961)

Synonyms
- Aphodius (Trichaphodius) commatoides Balthasar, 1961

Species of beetle

Gilletianus commatoides is a species of beetle of the family Scarabaeidae. It is found in China (Fujian), Cambodia, Indonesia (Sumba), Myanmar, Thailand and Vietnam.

== Description ==
Adults reach a length of about 4–4.5 mm (0.16–0.18 in). They have a moderately convex, glossy, yellowish-brown body, with part of the clypeus, the back of the head, and a large corner of the pronotum dark brown. The elytra have a light preeapical spot with a dark border anteriorly.
