= Psammodius nocturnus =

Scientific classification
- Kingdom: Animalia
- Phylum: Arthropoda
- Clade: Pancrustacea
- Class: Insecta
- Order: Coleoptera
- Suborder: Polyphaga
- Infraorder: Scarabaeiformia
- Family: Scarabaeidae
- Genus: Psammodius
- Species: P. nocturnus

Binomial name
- Psammodius nocturnus Reitter, 1892

Synonyms
- Psammobius brevior Normand, 1936; Psammobius lacoi Roubal, 1929

Species of beetle

Psammodius nocturnus is a species of beetle of the family Scarabaeidae. It is found in Algeria, Cyprus, Greece, Italy (Sicily), Lebanon, Montenegro, Syria and Tunisia.

== Description ==
Adults reach a length of about 3–3.3 mm (0.12–0.13 in). They have a shiny, strongly convex, light yellowish-brown body.
