= Melinopterus sertavulensis =

Scientific classification
- Kingdom: Animalia
- Phylum: Arthropoda
- Clade: Pancrustacea
- Class: Insecta
- Order: Coleoptera
- Suborder: Polyphaga
- Infraorder: Scarabaeiformia
- Family: Scarabaeidae
- Genus: Melinopterus
- Species: M. sertavulensis

Binomial name
- Melinopterus sertavulensis (Pittino, 1988)

Synonyms
- Aphodius (Melinopterus) sertavulensis Pittino, 1988

Species of beetle

Melinopterus sertavulensis is a species of beetle of the family Scarabaeidae. It is found in Turkey.

== Description ==
Adults reach a length of about 4.9–5.3 mm (0.19–0.21 in). They have an elongate-oval, stout body. The anterior part of the body is dark brown, with the sides of the head light reddish-yellow. The pronotum is yellow along the sides and yellow at the base and the elytra are yellowish-brown with a dark, diffuse spot.
