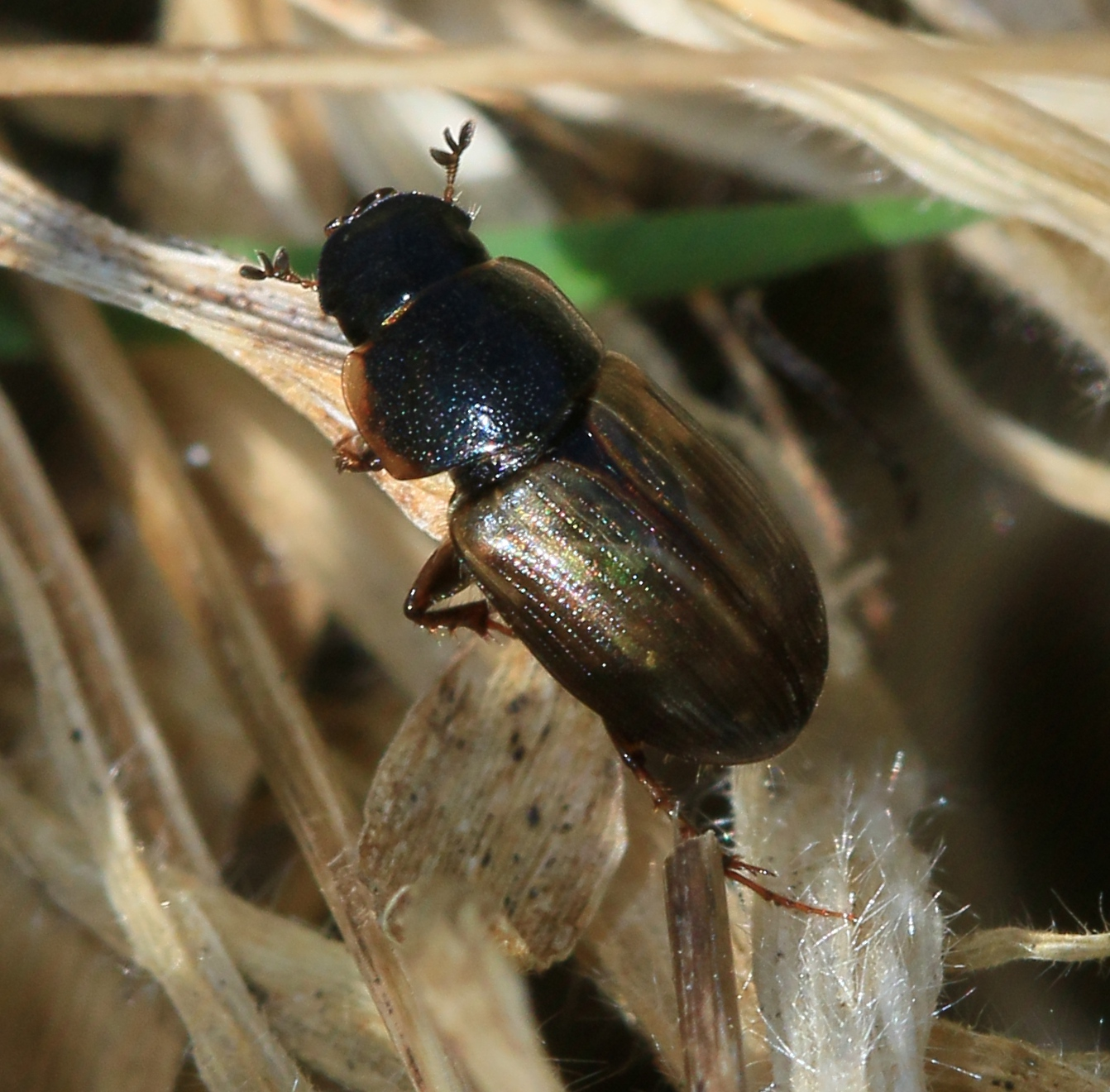

Conservation status
- Unranked (NatureServe)

Scientific classification
- Kingdom: Animalia
- Phylum: Arthropoda
- Clade: Pancrustacea
- Class: Insecta
- Order: Coleoptera
- Suborder: Polyphaga
- Infraorder: Scarabaeiformia
- Family: Scarabaeidae
- Subfamily: Aphodiinae
- Tribe: Aphodiini
- Genus: Melinopterus
- Species: M. prodromus

Binomial name
- Melinopterus prodromus (Brahm, 1790)

Synonyms
- Scarabaeus prodromus Brahm, 1790; Aphodius discoidalis Gistel, 1857; Aphodius gisteli Strand, 1917; Melinopterus discoidalis; Melinopterus gisteli; Aphodius (Melinopterus) prodromus abscurus Eichler, 1924; Aphodius (Melinopterus) prodromus lunulatus Eichler, 1924; Aphodius (Melinopterus) prodromus weberi Reitter, 1906; Aphodius (Melinopterus) mulsanti Orbigny, 1896; Aphodius (Melinopterus) consputus griseus Dalla Torre, 1879; Aphodius semipellitus Solsky, 1876; Aphodius syriacus Mulsant & Rey, 1870; Melinopterus prodromus angustatus Mulsant, 1842; Melinopterus prodromus flavogriseus Mulsant, 1842; Melinopterus prodromus griseolus Mulsant, 1842; Melinopterus prodromus obliquus Mulsant, 1842; Melinopterus prodromus restrictus Mulsant, 1842; Melinopterus prodromus semilunus Mulsant, 1842; Aphodius consputus Fabricius, 1801

= Melinopterus prodromus =

Species of beetle

Melinopterus prodromus is a species of scarab beetle in the family Scarabaeidae. It is found in the Palearctic and in North America, where it is an exotic species.

== Description ==
Adults reach a length of about 4.5–7.5 mm (0.18–0.30 in). They have an oblong, feebly convex, moderately shiny, pubescent body. The head and pronotum are shiny black, the latter with yellowish sides. The scutellum is blackish and the elytra are dirty yellowish with blackish suture and with a brownish spot.

== Distribution ==
Palaearctic: Afghanistan, Albania, Algeria, Armenia, Austria, Azerbaijan, Belarus, Belgium, Bosnia Herzegovina, Bulgaria, Croatia, Cyprus, Czech Republic, Denmark, Estonia, Finland, France, Georgia, Great Britain, Greece, Hungary, Iran, Ireland, Israel, Kazakhstan, Kyrgyzstan, Latvia, Lithuania, Luxembourg, Macedonia, Mongolia, Montenegro, Morocco, Netherlands, Norway, Poland, Portugal, Romania, Russia, Russia Far East, Serbia, Siberia, Slovakia, Slovenia, Sweden, Switzerland, Syria, Tajikistan, Turkey, Turkmenistan, Ukraine, Uzbekistan. Nearctic: Canada (Alberta, British Columbia, Manitoba, New Brunswick, Nova Scotia, Ontario, Prince Edward Island, Quebec, Saskatchewan), United States (Colorado, Iowa, Maine, Maryland, Michigan, Minnesota, Montana, Nebraska, North Dakota, South Dakota, Virginia).

== Taxonomy ==
This species was formerly a member of the genus Aphodius.
