= Gilletianus costatulus =

Scientific classification
- Kingdom: Animalia
- Phylum: Arthropoda
- Clade: Pancrustacea
- Class: Insecta
- Order: Coleoptera
- Suborder: Polyphaga
- Infraorder: Scarabaeiformia
- Family: Scarabaeidae
- Genus: Gilletianus
- Species: G. costatulus

Binomial name
- Gilletianus costatulus (Schmidt, 1908)

Synonyms
- Aphodius costatulus Schmidt, 1908; Aphodius (Pharaphodius) subpilosus Petrovitz, 1965; Aphodius (Pharaphodius) dindigalensis Balthasar, 1941

Species of beetle

Gilletianus costatulus is a species of beetle of the family Scarabaeidae. It is found in India (Andhra Pradesh, Assam, Goa, Rajasthan), Thailand, Vietnam, Bhutan, Nepal and Taiwan.

== Description ==
Adults reach a length of about 4–5.5 mm (0.16–0.22 in). They have an elongate-oval, slightly shiny, light to dark brown body. The back of the head, the disc of the pronotum, a spot within the lighter lateral margin, and the elytral suture are darker.
