= Melinopterus punctatosulcatus =

Scientific classification
- Kingdom: Animalia
- Phylum: Arthropoda
- Clade: Pancrustacea
- Class: Insecta
- Order: Coleoptera
- Suborder: Polyphaga
- Infraorder: Scarabaeiformia
- Family: Scarabaeidae
- Genus: Melinopterus
- Species: M. punctatosulcatus

Binomial name
- Melinopterus punctatosulcatus (Sturm, 1805)

Synonyms
- Aphodius punctatosulcatus Sturm, 1805; Aphodius (Melinopterus) punctatosulcatus funebris Reitter, 1892; Aphodius punctatosulcatus obscurellus Schilsky, 1888; Aphodius fimicola Gebler, 1833; Aphodius hirtipes Fischer von Waldheim, 1844; Aphodius (Nobius) pseudoinclusus Balthasar, 1963; Aphodius (Melinopterus) similis Koshantschikov, 1894; Aphodius sabulicola Thomson, 1868; Aphodius (Melinopterus) sphacelatus ponticus Petrovitz, 1967

Species of beetle

Melinopterus punctatosulcatus is a species of beetle of the family Scarabaeidae. It has a wide range in Europe, extending into western and central Asia to Mongolia and the Russian Far East.

== Description ==
Adults of the nominate subspecies reach a length of about 4–65 mm (0.16–2.56 in). The head is black, with reddish-brown sides. The pronotum is black, with yellowish or reddish-yellow sides and the elytra have a dark suture and a brown, diffuse spot.

== Subspecies ==
- Melinopterus punctatosulcatus punctatosulcatus (Austria, the Czech Republic, France, Germany, Great Britain, Hungary, Ireland, Italy, Morocco, the Netherlands, Poland, Portugal, Romania, Slovakia, Spain)
- Melinopterus punctatosulcatus hirtipes (Fischer von Waldheim, 1844) (Armenia, Azerbaijan, Belarus, Bosnia Herzegovina, China (Xinjiang), Estonia, Finland, Georgia, Greece, Iran, Iraq, Kazakhstan, Kyrgyzstan, Latvia, Mongolia, Norway, Romania, Russia (including the Russian Far East), Sweden, Tajikistan, Turkey, Turkmenistan, Ukraine, Uzbekistan)
- Melinopterus punctatosulcatus ponticus (Petrovitz, 1967) (Greece, Iran, Turkey)
