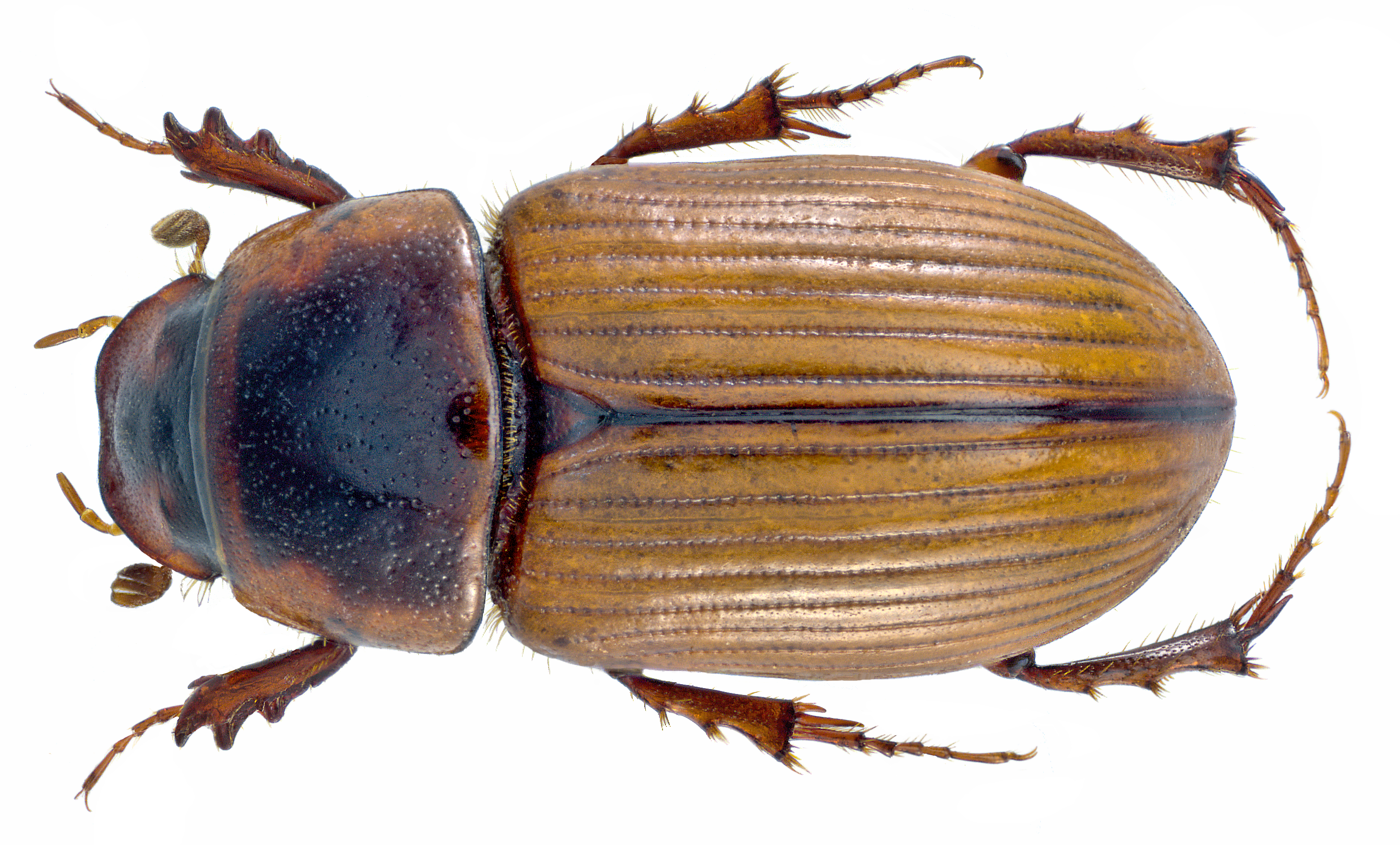
- Bodilopsis sordidus, Germany

Scientific classification
- Kingdom: Animalia
- Phylum: Arthropoda
- Clade: Pancrustacea
- Class: Insecta
- Order: Coleoptera
- Suborder: Polyphaga
- Infraorder: Scarabaeiformia
- Family: Scarabaeidae
- Genus: Bodilopsis
- Species: B. sordidus

Binomial name
- Bodilopsis sordidus (Fabricius, 1775)

Synonyms
- Scarabaeus sordidus Fabricius, 1775; Aphodius sordidus; Aphodius (Bodilus) sordidus changajicus Endrödi, 1965; Bodilus sordidus bipunctatus Negrobov, 2016; Aphodius hungaricus Strand, 1917; Aphodius sordidus nigromaculatus Schmidt, 1909; Aphodius sordidus simplex Bouskell, 1901; Aphodius sordidus creutzeri Dalla Torre, 1879; Aphodius equinarius Gistel, 1857; Aphodius porcellus Gistel, 1857; Aphodius signatipennis Mulsant, 1852; Aphodius sordidus bipunctatellus Mulsant, 1842; Aphodius sordidus limbatellus Mulsant, 1842; Scarabaeus quadripunctatus Panzer, 1789

= Bodilopsis sordidus =

Species of beetle

Bodilopsis sordidus, commonly known as the Brown domino beetle, is a species of scarab beetle found in the Palearctic.

== Description ==
Adults reach a length of about 5–7 mm (0.20–0.28 in). They have an elongate, convex, nearly glabrous, mostly shiny body (but the elytra are partly dull). The head and pronotum are reddish, the latter with a darker discal spot. The elytra are pale testaceous with darker suture and the legs are brownish.

== Subspecies ==
These two subspecies belong to the species Bodilopsis sordidus:

- Bodilopsis sordidus changajicus (Endrödi, 1965) (Mongolia)
- Bodilopsis sordidus sordidus (Fabricius, 1775) (Palearctic)

== Life history ==
Specimens have been collected from horse, cow, sheep and human dung.

== Taxonomy ==
This species was formerly a member of the genus Aphodius.
