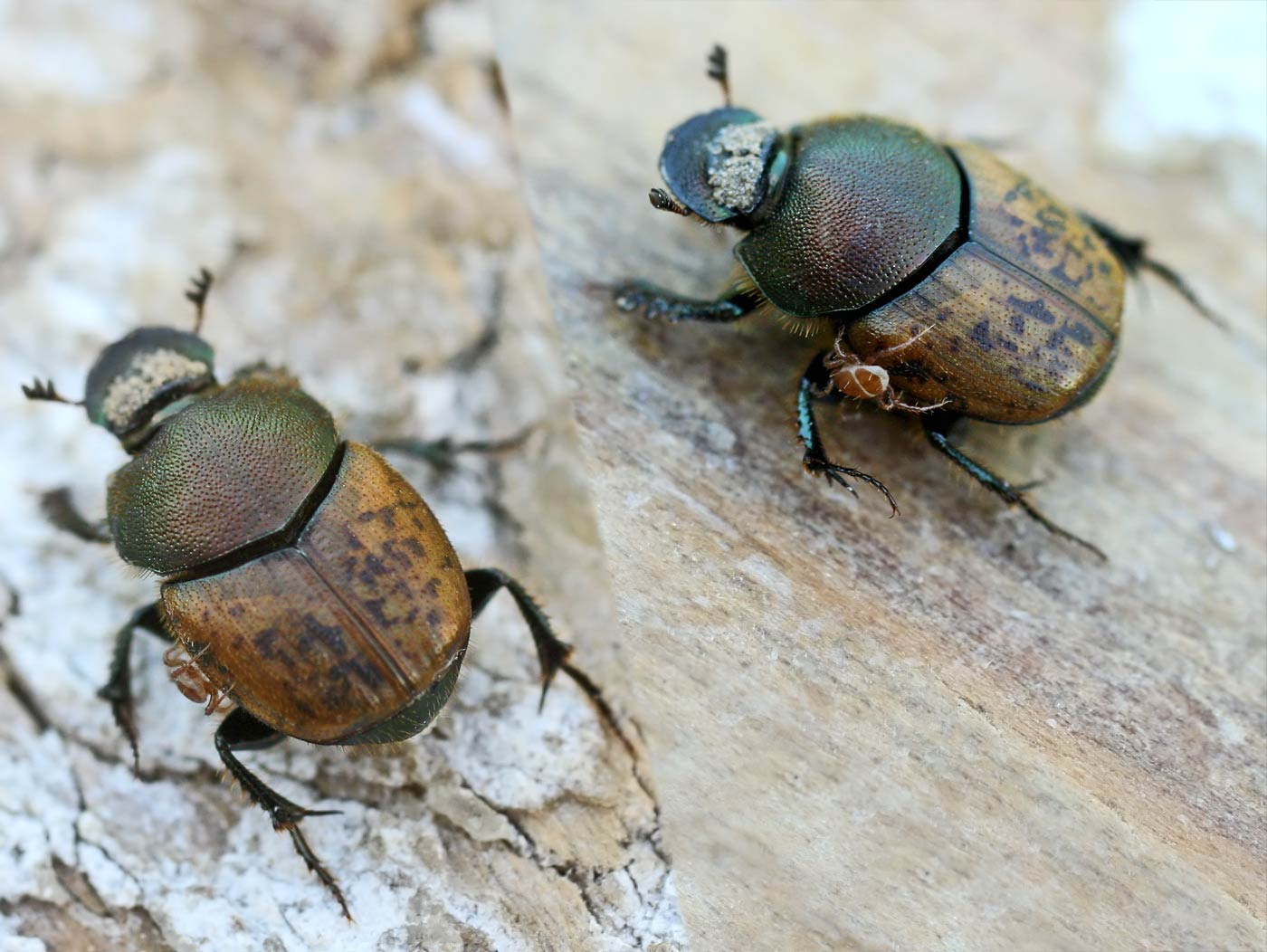

Scientific classification
- Kingdom: Animalia
- Phylum: Arthropoda
- Clade: Pancrustacea
- Class: Insecta
- Order: Coleoptera
- Suborder: Polyphaga
- Infraorder: Scarabaeiformia
- Family: Scarabaeidae
- Genus: Onthophagus
- Species: O. coenobita

Binomial name
- Onthophagus coenobita (Herbst, 1783)

= Onthophagus coenobita =

Species of beetle

Onthophagus coenobita is a species of dung beetle in the genus Onthophagus.

It typically feeds on dung, but also carrion and decaying fungi. It mainly feeds on human dung, but also dog, cattle, horse, goat, sheep and pig dung.
