= Coptochiroides =

Scientific classification
- Kingdom: Animalia
- Phylum: Arthropoda
- Clade: Pancrustacea
- Class: Insecta
- Order: Coleoptera
- Suborder: Polyphaga
- Infraorder: Scarabaeiformia
- Family: Scarabaeidae
- Subfamily: Aphodiinae
- Tribe: Aphodiini
- Genus: Coptochiroides; Balthasar, 1938

Synonyms
- Aphodius (Coptochiroides) Balthasar, 1938

Genus of beetles

Coptochiroides is a genus of beetles of the family Scarabaeidae.

== Species ==
- Coptochiroides laotianus (Červenka, 2005)
- Coptochiroides subcostatus (Kolbe, 1886)
