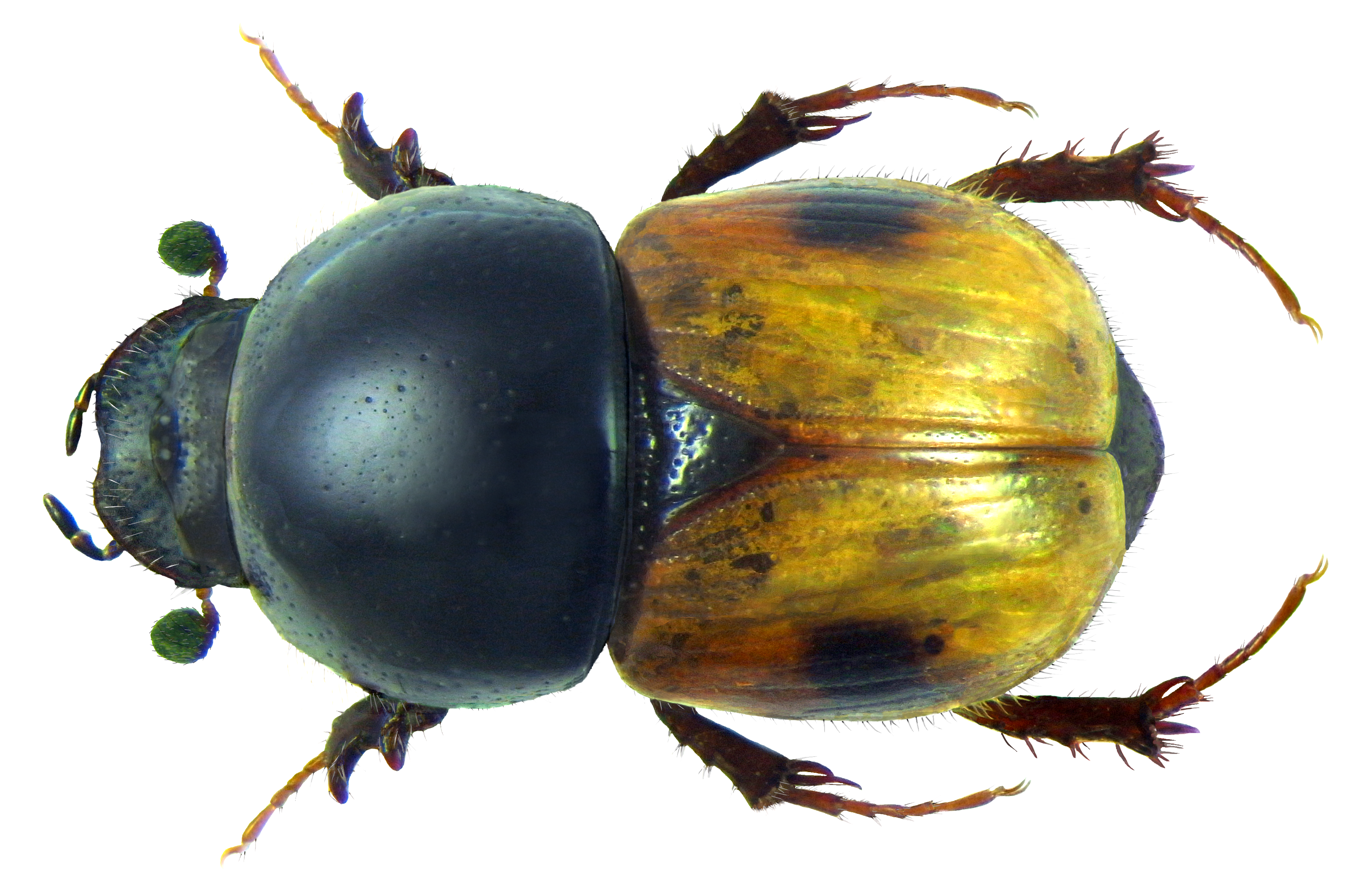

Scientific classification
- Kingdom: Animalia
- Phylum: Arthropoda
- Clade: Pancrustacea
- Class: Insecta
- Order: Coleoptera
- Suborder: Polyphaga
- Infraorder: Scarabaeiformia
- Family: Scarabaeidae
- Genus: Megatelus
- Species: M. contractus

Binomial name
- Megatelus contractus (Klug, 1830)

Synonyms
- Aphodius contractus Klug, 1830; Otophorus scolytoides Lucas, 1846; Aphodius brevis Dejean, 1833

= Megatelus contractus =

Species of beetle

Megatelus contractus is a species of beetle of the family Scarabaeidae. It is found in Afghanistan, Cyprus, Egypt, Libya, Morocco, Oman, Syria, Turkey, Chad, Djibouti, Ethiopia, Kenya, Niger, Senegal, Sudan and India (Rajasthan).

== Description ==
Adults reach a length of about 4–4.5 mm (0.16–0.18 in). They have a short, broad, glossy body. The head and pronotum are black. The elytra are yellow with a dark patch that covers the sides and short light-colored hairs toward the rear and along the side. The scutellum and surrounding area are black.
