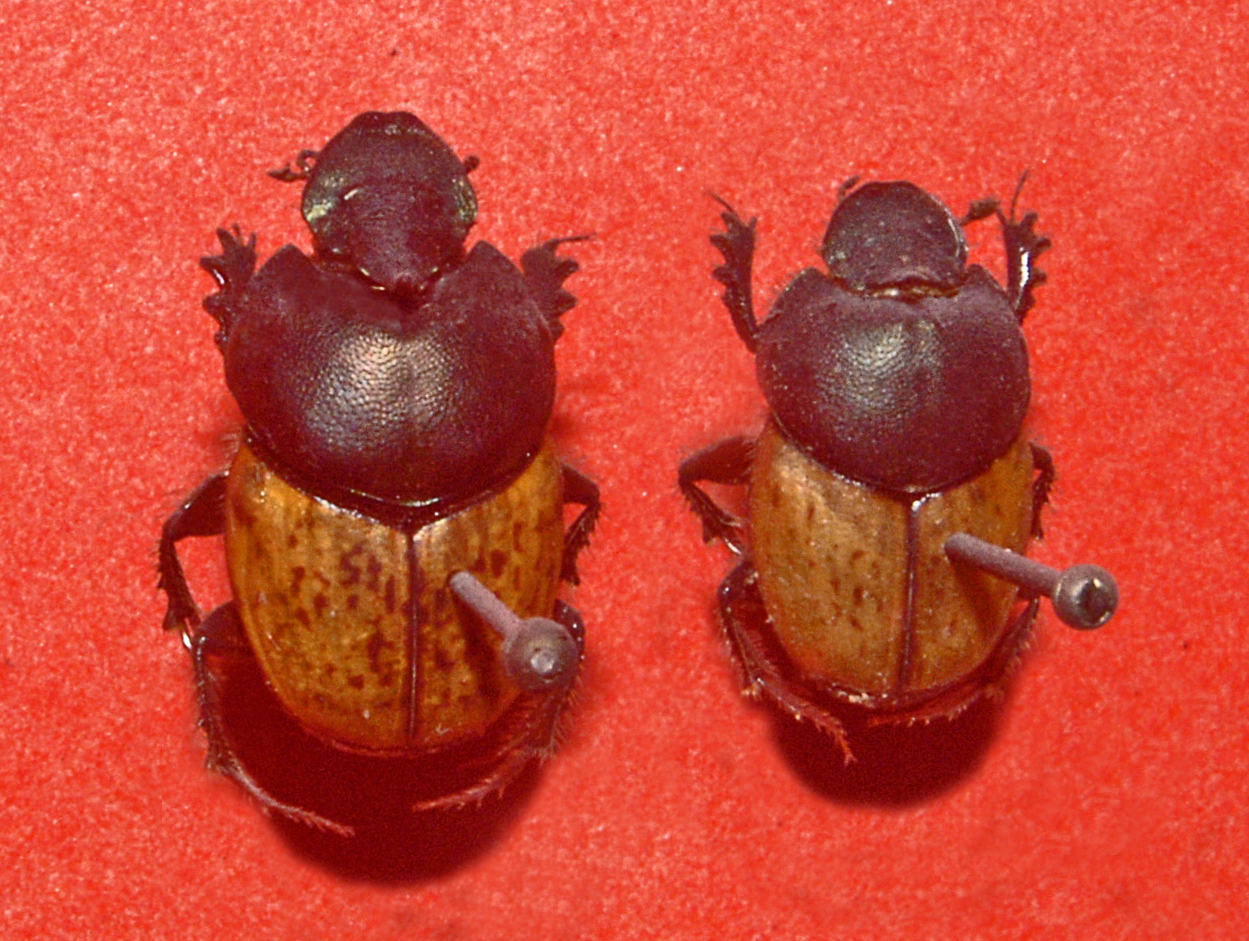
- Onthophagus vacca, male and female. Museum specimens

Scientific classification
- Kingdom: Animalia
- Phylum: Arthropoda
- Clade: Pancrustacea
- Class: Insecta
- Order: Coleoptera
- Suborder: Polyphaga
- Infraorder: Scarabaeiformia
- Family: Scarabaeidae
- Genus: Onthophagus
- Species: O. vacca

Binomial name
- Onthophagus vacca (Linnaeus, 1767)

= Onthophagus vacca =

Species of beetle

Onthophagus vacca is a species of dung beetles in the Onthophagini tribe of the wider scarab beetle family, Scarabaeidae.

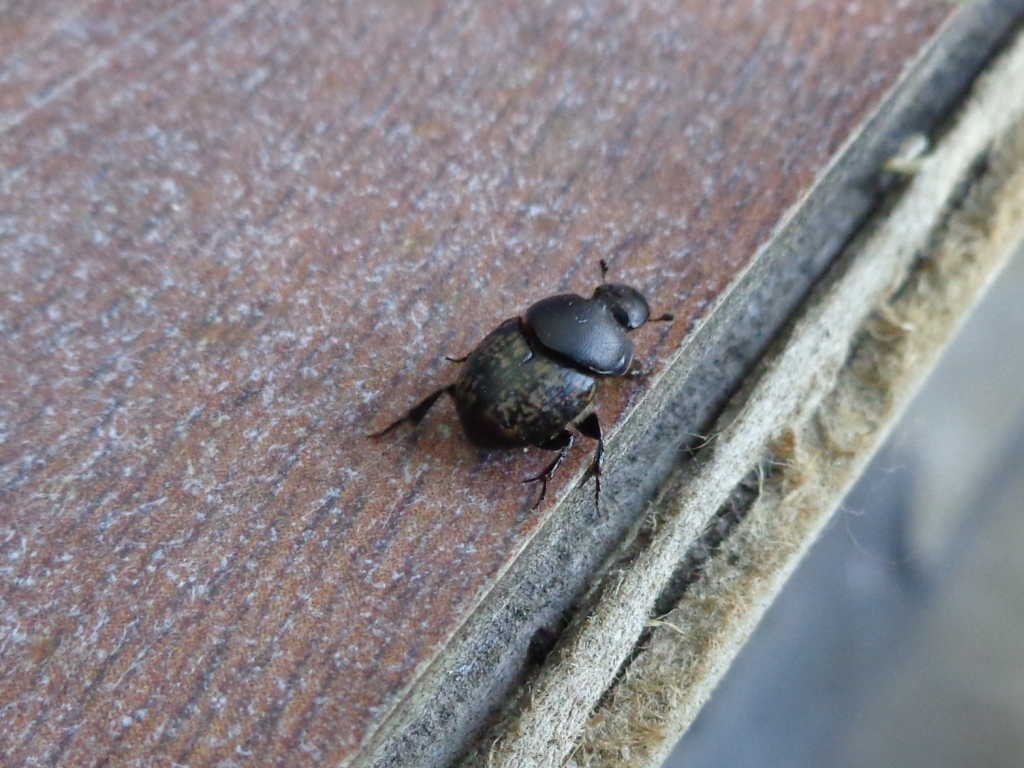
Onthophagus vacca

== Description ==
Onthophagus vacca can reach a length of 7–13 millimetres (0.28–0.51 in). Pronotum is densely punctured. The first pair of legs are powerful, with three teeth on the outside and fit to digging. Head, legs and pronotum are black or dark green, while elytrae are yellowish with small green dots, often merged into longitudinal stripes.

== Distribution ==
This species is present in most of Southern Europe, Western Asia and North Africa. It was introduced to Australia in 2014 to improve processing of cattle dung.

== Bibliography ==
- Mulsant E. (1842) Histoire naturelle des Coléoptères de France. Lamellicornes, Paris, Lyon :1-623
- Linnaeus C. (1767) Systema naturae per regna tria naturae, secundum classes, ordines, genera, species cum characteribus, differentiis, synonymis, locis. Editio XII, Laurentii Salvi, Holmiae 1:1-1327
- Scarabs: World Scarabaeidae Database. Schoolmeesters P.
- Rossner, E.; Schonfeld, J.; Ahrens, D. 2010. Onthophagus (Palaeonthophagus) medius (Kugelann, 1792)—a good western palaearctic species in the Onthophagus vacca complex (Coleoptera: Scarabaeidae: Scarabaeinae: Onthophagini). Zootaxa 2629: 1–28.
- Peter Sowig Brood care in the dung beetle Onthophagus vacca (Coleoptera: Scarabaeidae): the effect of soil moisture on time budget, nest structure, and reproductive success Volume 19, Issue 3, pages 254–258, January 1996
