= Psammodius asper =

Scientific classification
- Kingdom: Animalia
- Phylum: Arthropoda
- Clade: Pancrustacea
- Class: Insecta
- Order: Coleoptera
- Suborder: Polyphaga
- Infraorder: Scarabaeiformia
- Family: Scarabaeidae
- Genus: Psammodius
- Species: P. asper

Binomial name
- Psammodius asper (Fabricius, 1775)

Synonyms
- Scarabaeus asper Fabricius, 1775; Psammodius costatus Stierlin, 1863; Rhyssemus asper rufiper Mulsant, 1842; Aphodius sulcicollis Illiger, 1802; Psammobius sulcicollis; Scarabaeus cruciatosulcatus Preyssler, 1790

Species of beetle

Psammodius asper is a species of beetle of the family Scarabaeidae. It is found in Armenia, Austria, Azerbaijan, Belarus, Belgium, Bulgaria, Croatia, the Czech Republic, Denmark, Estonia, Finland, Germany, Great Britain, Hungary, Iran, Italy, Kazakhstan, Latvia, Lithuania, Luxembourg, Macedonia, Montenegro, Moldova, Mongolia, the Netherlands, Norway, Poland, Portugal, Romania, Russia (including the Russian Far East and Siberia), Serbia, Slovakia, Sweden, Switzerland, Turkey and Ukraine.

== Description ==
Adults reach a length of about 2.6–4 mm (0.10–0.16 in). They have a strongly convex, glossy, blackish-brown or sometimes light reddish-brown body. The legs are lighter reddish-brown.
