= Brindalus porcicollis =

Scientific classification
- Kingdom: Animalia
- Phylum: Arthropoda
- Clade: Pancrustacea
- Class: Insecta
- Order: Coleoptera
- Suborder: Polyphaga
- Infraorder: Scarabaeiformia
- Family: Scarabaeidae
- Genus: Brindalus
- Species: B. porcicollis

Binomial name
- Brindalus porcicollis (Illiger, 1803)

Synonyms
- Aphodius porcicollis Illiger, 1803; Phycocus (Brindalus) azoricus Landin, 1960; Psammodius porcicollis rugosulus Mulsant, 1842

Species of beetle

Brindalus porcicollis is a species of beetle of the family Scarabaeidae. It is found in Albania, Algeria, the Azores, Cyprus, France, France (Corsica), Great Britain, Lebanon, Libya, Greece (Crete), Malta, Montenegro, Morocco, Portugal, Spain, Syria, Tunisia and Turkey.

== Description ==
Adults reach a length of about 3.3–3.4 mm (0.13–0.13 in). They have a shiny, strongly convex, blackish-brown body (although immature specimens are reddish-brown). The legs are reddish-brown.
