= Melinopterus sphacelatus =

Scientific classification
- Kingdom: Animalia
- Phylum: Arthropoda
- Clade: Pancrustacea
- Class: Insecta
- Order: Coleoptera
- Suborder: Polyphaga
- Infraorder: Scarabaeiformia
- Family: Scarabaeidae
- Genus: Melinopterus
- Species: M. sphacelatus

Binomial name
- Melinopterus sphacelatus (Reitter, 1892)

Synonyms
- Scarabaeus sphacelatus Panzer, 1798; Aphodius punctatosulcatus convexifrons Rey, 1890; Aphodius punctatosulcatus laeviceps Rey, 1890; Melinopterus prodromus extensus Mulsant, 1842; Aphodius hirtellus Laporte, 1840; Aphodius marginalis Stephens, 1830

Species of beetle

Melinopterus sphacelatus is a species of beetle of the family Scarabaeidae. It is found in Algeria, Armenia, Austria, Belarus, Belgium, Bosnia Herzegovina, Bulgaria, Croatia, the Czech Republic, Denmark, Estonia, Finland, France, Georgia, Germany, Great Britain, Greece, Hungary, Iran, Iraq, Ireland, Israel, Italy, Latvia, Lithuania, Macedonia, Montenegro, Morocco, the Netherlands, Norway, Poland, Portugal, Romania, Russia, Serbia, Slovakia, Slovenia, Spain, Sweden, Switzerland, Tunisia, Turkey and Ukraine.

== Description ==
Adults reach a length of about 5–7 mm (0.20–0.28 in). The head is black with reddish-brown to yellowish-brown sides. The pronotum is black, with yellowish margins on the sides and a yellowish border at the base. The elytra have a dark suture and a brown, cloudy spot.
