= Limarus zenkeri =

Scientific classification
- Kingdom: Animalia
- Phylum: Arthropoda
- Clade: Pancrustacea
- Class: Insecta
- Order: Coleoptera
- Suborder: Polyphaga
- Infraorder: Scarabaeiformia
- Family: Scarabaeidae
- Genus: Limarus
- Species: L. zenkeri

Binomial name
- Limarus zenkeri (Germar, 1813)

Synonyms
- Aphodius zenkeri Germar, 1813; Aphodius (Limarus) zenkeri parabrevifascia Dellacasa, 1983; Aphodius (Limarus) zenkeri parainvolutus Dellacasa, 1983; Aphodius (Oromus) ceresai Schatzmayr, 1941; Aphodius (Limarus) zenkeri maculifer Reitter, 1909; Aphodius rupestris Gistel, 1857; Aphodius gibbulus Dejean, 1833

Species of beetle

Limarus zenkeri is a species of beetle of the family Scarabaeidae. It is found in Austria, Belarus, Belgium, Bosnia and Herzegovina, Croatia, the Czech Republic, Denmark, France, Germany, Great Britain, Italy, Luxembourg, the Netherlands, Poland, Romania, Russia, Slovakia, Slovenia, Sweden, Switzerland and Ukraine.

== Description ==
Adults reach a length of about 4–5 mm (0.16–0.20 in). They have an oblong, convex, shiny, nearly glabrous, blackish body. The margin of the clypeus, sides of the pronotum and the elytra are brown-reddish. In most specimens, the elytra have small blackish spots arranged in bend lines.
