= Planolinoides borealis =

Scientific classification
- Kingdom: Animalia
- Phylum: Arthropoda
- Clade: Pancrustacea
- Class: Insecta
- Order: Coleoptera
- Suborder: Polyphaga
- Infraorder: Scarabaeiformia
- Family: Scarabaeidae
- Genus: Planolinoides
- Species: P. borealis

Binomial name
- Planolinoides borealis (Gyllenhal, 1827)

Synonyms
- Aphodius borealis Gyllenhal, 1827; Planolinus borealis; Agrilinus (Planolinus) borealis basomaculatus Negrobov, 2010; Agrilinus (Planolinus) borealis bimaculatus Negrobov, 2010; Agrilinus (Planolinus) borealis varvarinus Negrobov, 2010; Aphodius errans Brown, 1930; Aphodius putridus evanescens Bouskell, 1901; Aphodius putridus gyllenhalii Seidlitz, 1891; Aphodius sedulus Harold, 1871; Aphodius hespericus Gistel, 1857; Aphodius putridus Sturm, 1805

Species of beetle

Planolinoides borealis, the mouse dung beetle, is a widespread species of beetle of the family Scarabaeidae.

== Description ==
Adults reach a length of about 3.5–5 mm (0.14–0.20 in). They have an oblong, convex, glabrous, moderately shiny body, although the elytra are partly dull. They are blackish or piceous, with the anterior angles of the pronotum reddish. The elytra ussually have some reddish areas, but are sometimes completely reddish.

== Distribution ==
Nearctic: Canada (Alberta, British Columbia, Labrador, Manitoba, New Brunswick, Newfoundland, Northwest Territories, Nova Scotia, Ontario, Quebec, Saskatchewan, Yukon Territory), United States (Alaska). Palaearctic: Austria, Belarus, Belgium, Bosnia Herzegovina, Bulgaria, Croatia, the Czech Republic, Denmark, Estonia, Finland, France, Georgia, Germany, Great Britian, Hungary, Ireland, Italy, Kazakhstan, Latvia, Lithuania, Macedonia, Montenegro, Mongolia, the Netherlands, Norway, Poland, Portugal, Romania, Russia (including the Russian Far East and Siberia), Serbia, Slovakia, Spain, Sweden, Switzerland and Ukraine.
