= Paracrossidius =

Scientific classification
- Kingdom: Animalia
- Phylum: Arthropoda
- Clade: Pancrustacea
- Class: Insecta
- Order: Coleoptera
- Suborder: Polyphaga
- Infraorder: Scarabaeiformia
- Family: Scarabaeidae
- Subfamily: Aphodiinae
- Tribe: Aphodiini
- Genus: Paracrossidius; Balthasar, 1932

Synonyms
- Aphodius (Paracrossidius) Balthasar, 1932

Genus of beetles

Paracrossidius is a genus of beetles of the family Scarabaeidae.

== Species ==
- Paracrossidius impressiusculus (Fairmaire, 1888)
- Paracrossidius instigator (Balthasar, 1932)
- Paracrossidius kozlovi (Koshantschikov, 1916)
- Paracrossidius laticapitus (Zhang, 1992)
- Paracrossidius melanodiscus (Zhang, 1992)
- Paracrossidius planipennis (Petrovitz, 1961)
- Paracrossidius radekcervenkai Červenka, 2017
- Paracrossidius sichuanensis (Zhang, 1992)
- Paracrossidius suvorovi (Kabakov, 1996)
- Paracrossidius transmontanus (Balthasar, 1932)
- Paracrossidius truculentus (Balthasar, 1963)
