= A. conferta =

A. conferta may refer to:

- Aaptos conferta, a New Zealand sea sponge
- Aegialia conferta, a North American dung beetle
- Acacia conferta, commonly known as crowded-leaf wattle, an Australian shrub
- Amblymora conferta, an Indonesian beetle
- Anisodes conferta, a synonym of Cyclophora conferta, a Jamaican moth
- Arabis conferta, a synonym of Arabis hirsuta, a European plant
- Arachnorchis conferta, a synonym of Caladenia conferta, a South Australian plant
- Asperula conferta, an Australian plant
- Asura conferta, a synonym of Nepita conferta, commonly known as the footman moth
