= Blue woodruff =

Blue woodruff is a common name for several plants and may refer to:

- Asperula arvensis
- Asperula orientalis
