= Asperula asthenes =

Conservation status
- Vulnerable (EPBC Act)

Scientific classification
- Kingdom: Plantae
- Clade: Tracheophytes
- Clade: Angiosperms
- Clade: Eudicots
- Clade: Asterids
- Order: Gentianales
- Family: Rubiaceae
- Genus: Asperula
- Species: A. asthenes

Binomial name
- Asperula asthenes Airy Shaw & Turrill

Species of plant in the coffee family

Asperula asthenes is a species of flowering plant in the family Rubiaceae, known as trailing woodruff, and is endemic to the east coast of New South Wales, Australia

== Description ==
This is a low perennial herb. Leaves are arranged in whorls of four around the stem. The flowers are small, white and star-shaped; fruit are tiny and two-lobed, 1 mm in length.

== Distribution ==
The species occurs in New South Wales only, growing in damp areas mainly along river banks. Reported locations are the Central Coast north to near Kempsey, and the Port Stephens, Wallis Lake and Forster area.

== Threats ==
The species is under threat from herbicide use, invasive weed species, and disturbance from stock grazing. Water table raising to reduce acid sulphate discharge may be potentially be detrimental.
