= Asperula tetraphylla =

Scientific classification
- Kingdom: Plantae
- Clade: Tracheophytes
- Clade: Angiosperms
- Clade: Eudicots
- Clade: Asterids
- Order: Gentianales
- Family: Rubiaceae
- Genus: Asperula
- Species: A. tetraphylla

Binomial name
- Asperula tetraphylla (Airy Shaw & Turrill) I.Thomps.

Species of plant

Asperula tetraphylla is a species of flowering plant in the family Rubiaceae. It was first described in 2009 and is endemic to South Australia.
