= Cyperus nervosostriatus =

Scientific classification
- Kingdom: Plantae
- Clade: Embryophytes
- Clade: Tracheophytes
- Clade: Angiosperms
- Clade: Monocots
- Clade: Commelinids
- Order: Poales
- Family: Cyperaceae
- Genus: Cyperus
- Species: C. nervosostriatus

Binomial name
- Cyperus nervosostriatus Turrill, 1925

Species of sedge

Cyperus nervosostriatus is a species of sedge that is endemic to the Northern Provinces of South Africa.

== See also ==
- List of Cyperus species
