= Asperula virgata =

Conservation status
- Endangered (IUCN 3.1)

Scientific classification
- Kingdom: Plantae
- Clade: Tracheophytes
- Clade: Angiosperms
- Clade: Eudicots
- Clade: Asterids
- Order: Gentianales
- Family: Rubiaceae
- Genus: Asperula
- Species: A. virgata

Binomial name
- Asperula virgata Hub.-Mor. ex Ehrend. & Schönb.-Tem.

Species of plant

Asperula virgata, the rod-shaped woodruff, is a species of plant in the family Rubiaceae. It is a subshrub endemic to Turkey, and is found in Erzurum and Artvin provinces. It grows on limestone scree, at elevations of 700–1,100 m. It is threatened by overgrazing, road construction, dam construction and erosion.
