= Asperula serotina =

Scientific classification
- Kingdom: Plantae
- Clade: Tracheophytes
- Clade: Angiosperms
- Clade: Eudicots
- Clade: Asterids
- Order: Gentianales
- Family: Rubiaceae
- Genus: Asperula
- Species: A. serotina

Binomial name
- Asperula serotina (Boiss. & Heldr.) Ehrend.

Synonyms
- Galium serotinum Boiss. & Heldr.

Species of plant in the coffee family

Asperula serotina is a species of flowering plant in the family Rubiaceae. It was first described in 1982 and is endemic to Turkey.
