= Asperula podlechii =

Scientific classification
- Kingdom: Plantae
- Clade: Tracheophytes
- Clade: Angiosperms
- Clade: Eudicots
- Clade: Asterids
- Order: Gentianales
- Family: Rubiaceae
- Genus: Asperula
- Species: A. podlechii

Binomial name
- Asperula podlechii Schönb.-Tem.

Species of plant

Asperula podlechii is a species of flowering plant in the family Rubiaceae. It was first described in 2005 and is endemic to Afghanistan.
