= Amblymora keyana =

Scientific classification
- Kingdom: Animalia
- Phylum: Arthropoda
- Class: Insecta
- Order: Coleoptera
- Suborder: Polyphaga
- Infraorder: Cucujiformia
- Family: Cerambycidae
- Genus: Amblymora
- Species: A. keyana

Binomial name
- Amblymora keyana Breuning, 1965

Species of beetle

Amblymora keyana is a species of beetle in the family Cerambycidae. It was first described by Stephan von Breuning in 1965. It is known from Moluccas.
