= Asperula crassula =

Scientific classification
- Kingdom: Plantae
- Clade: Tracheophytes
- Clade: Angiosperms
- Clade: Eudicots
- Clade: Asterids
- Order: Gentianales
- Family: Rubiaceae
- Genus: Asperula
- Species: A. crassula

Binomial name
- Asperula crassula Greuter & Zaffran

Species of plant

Asperula crassula is a species of flowering plant in the family Rubiaceae, endemic to a few hundred hectares in northeast Crete. It was first described in 1857.

== Description ==
Asperula crassula is perennial, short, and cushion-shaped. Its stems are worm-shaped and are often 2–4 mm long. Its flowers are short, dense, sub-cylindrical, medially bipartite, and about 1.5 mm long. It occurs on rocky slopes and flats of limestone and sandstone.
