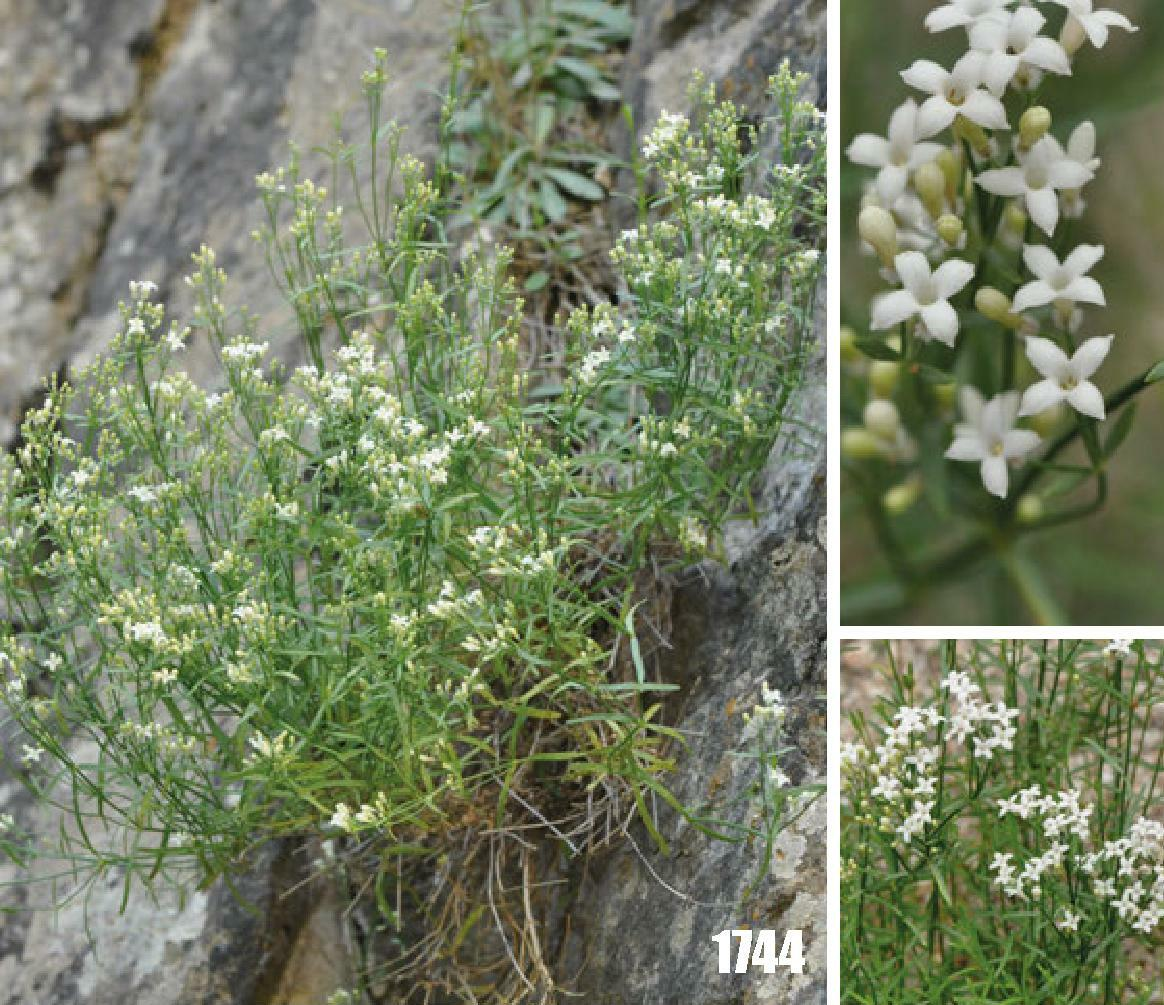

Scientific classification
- Kingdom: Plantae
- Clade: Tracheophytes
- Clade: Angiosperms
- Clade: Eudicots
- Clade: Asterids
- Order: Gentianales
- Family: Rubiaceae
- Genus: Asperula
- Species: A. albiflora

Binomial name
- Asperula albiflora Popov

= Asperula albiflora =

Species of plant in the coffee family

Asperula albiflora is a deciduous species of perennial groundcover, and a flowering plant in the family Rubiaceae, known as Woodruff, and is endemic to Turkmenistan, and was first named by Popov.

== Description ==
Asperula albiflora appears as a small green moss-like plant, with small (1in) pale pink flowers, on stems, it has a compact cushion of small, green, needle-like, leaves.

== Growth cycle ==
Asperula albiflora flowers around May–June, and grows best in a rock garden, trough or crevice.
