= Asperula apuana =

Scientific classification
- Kingdom: Plantae
- Clade: Tracheophytes
- Clade: Angiosperms
- Clade: Eudicots
- Clade: Asterids
- Order: Gentianales
- Family: Rubiaceae
- Genus: Asperula
- Species: A. apuana

Binomial name
- Asperula apuana (Fiori) Arrigoni

Synonyms
- Asperula purpurea subsp. apuana (Fiori) Bechi & Garbari; Galium purpureum var. apuanum Fiori

Species of plant in the coffee family

Asperula apuana is a deciduous species of perennial groundcover, and a flowering plant in the family Rubiaceae, known as Woodruff, and is endemic to Italy, and was first named by (Fiori) Arrigoni.

== Description ==
Asperula apuana appears as a long green heather-like plant, with small (1 inch or 25 millimetres) white flowers, on long, rough, woody stems, it has compact small, green, needle-like, leaves.

== Growth cycle ==
Asperula apuana flowers around May–June, and grows best in a rock garden, trough or crevice.
