= Asperula scoparia =

Scientific classification
- Kingdom: Plantae
- Clade: Tracheophytes
- Clade: Angiosperms
- Clade: Eudicots
- Clade: Asterids
- Order: Gentianales
- Family: Rubiaceae
- Genus: Asperula
- Species: A. scoparia

Binomial name
- Asperula scoparia Hook f.

Species of plant

Asperula scoparia is a species of flowering plant in the family Rubiaceae. It was first described in 1847 and is endemic to Tasmania, Victoria and New South Wales in Australia.
