= Aegialia latispina =

Scientific classification
- Domain: Eukaryota
- Kingdom: Animalia
- Phylum: Arthropoda
- Class: Insecta
- Order: Coleoptera
- Suborder: Polyphaga
- Infraorder: Scarabaeiformia
- Family: Scarabaeidae
- Genus: Aegialia
- Species: A. latispina

Binomial name
- Aegialia latispina Leconte, 1878

Species of beetle

Aegialia latispina is a species of aphodiine dung beetle in the family Scarabaeidae. It is found in North America.
