= Aegialia cartwrighti =

Scientific classification
- Domain: Eukaryota
- Kingdom: Animalia
- Phylum: Arthropoda
- Class: Insecta
- Order: Coleoptera
- Suborder: Polyphaga
- Infraorder: Scarabaeiformia
- Family: Scarabaeidae
- Genus: Aegialia
- Species: A. cartwrighti

Binomial name
- Aegialia cartwrighti Stebnicka, 1977

Species of beetle

Aegialia cartwrighti is a species of aphodiine dung beetle in the family Scarabaeidae. It is found in North America.
