= Amblymora =

Scientific classification
- Domain: Eukaryota
- Kingdom: Animalia
- Phylum: Arthropoda
- Class: Insecta
- Order: Coleoptera
- Suborder: Polyphaga
- Infraorder: Cucujiformia
- Family: Cerambycidae
- Tribe: Desmiphorini
- Genus: Amblymora; Pascoe, 1867

Genus of beetles

Amblymora (=Australothelais) is a genus of longhorn beetles of the subfamily Lamiinae, containing the following species:

- Amblymora australica Breuning, 1948 [Subgenus Australamblymora]
- Amblymora baloghi Breuning, 1975
- Amblymora bivittata Breuning, 1939
- Amblymora carinipennis Breuning, 1974
- Amblymora conferta Pascoe, 1867
- Amblymora consputa Pascoe, 1867
- Amblymora demarzi (Breuning, 1963)
- Amblymora densepunctata (Breuning, 1963)
- Amblymora elongata Breuning, 1943
- Amblymora excavata Breuning, 1939
- Amblymora fergussoni Breuning, 1970
- Amblymora fumosa Pascoe, 1867
- Amblymora gebeensis Breuning, 1958
- Amblymora instabilis Pascoe, 1867
- Amblymora keyana Breuning, 1965
- Amblymora marmorata Breuning, 1939
- Amblymora multiguttata Breuning, 1948 [Subgenus Diallamblymora]
- Amblymora obiensis Breuning, 1956
- Amblymora papuana Breuning, 1939
- Amblymora pseudoconferta Breuning, 1939
- Amblymora rufula Breuning, 1950
- Amblymora samarensis Breuning, 1947
- Amblymora spinipennis Breuning, 1939
- Amblymora strandiella Breuning, 1943
- Amblymora uniformis Jordan, 1894
- Amblymora v-flava Gilmour, 1950
