= Asperula libanotica =

Scientific classification
- Kingdom: Plantae
- Clade: Tracheophytes
- Clade: Angiosperms
- Clade: Eudicots
- Clade: Asterids
- Order: Gentianales
- Family: Rubiaceae
- Genus: Asperula
- Species: A. libanotica

Binomial name
- Asperula libanotica Boiss.

Species of plant

Asperula libanotica is a species of flowering plant in the family Rubiaceae. It was first described in 1849 and is endemic to Lebanon, Syria and Palestine.

== Description ==
The plant is multi-stemmed, glabrous, with filiform, soft, ascending stems, somewhat scabrous (rough to the touch), and typically grows to a height of 20–60 cm. Its leaves are arranged in whorls of six, ovate-oblong, somewhat acute, with three veins and scabrous margins. The flowers are terminal, arranged in fasciculate-capitate clusters. The bracts numbering 6–12, and are elliptic, lanceolate, unequal, and glabrous, being shorter than the corolla. The corolla is white, with a tube that gradually widens above the limb, reaching twice the length of the limb. The corolla lobes are ovate and somewhat acute. The stamens are linear and black. The style is long, and bipartite. It flowers from April till June.
