= Asperula acuminata =

Scientific classification
- Kingdom: Plantae
- Clade: Tracheophytes
- Clade: Angiosperms
- Clade: Eudicots
- Clade: Asterids
- Order: Gentianales
- Family: Rubiaceae
- Genus: Asperula
- Species: A. acuminata

Binomial name
- Asperula acuminata I.Thomps.

Species of plant in the coffee family

Asperula acuminata is a deciduous species of perennial groundcover, and a flowering plant in the family Rubiaceae, known as Woodruff, and is endemic to NE. New South Wales of Australia, and was first named by I.Thomps.

== Description ==
Asperula acuminata appears as a small green moss-like plant, with small (1in) pale pink flowers, on stems, it has a compact cushion of small, green, needle-like, leaves.

== Growth cycle ==
Asperula acuminata flowers around May–June, and grows best in a rock garden, trough or crevice.
