= Asperula brachyantha =

Scientific classification
- Kingdom: Plantae
- Clade: Tracheophytes
- Clade: Angiosperms
- Clade: Eudicots
- Clade: Asterids
- Order: Gentianales
- Family: Rubiaceae
- Genus: Asperula
- Species: A. brachyantha

Binomial name
- Asperula brachyantha Boiss.

Species of plant in the coffee family

Asperula brachyantha is a species of flowering plant in the family Rubiaceae.

== Description ==
Asperula brachyantha was first described in 1845 and is endemic to Iran.
