= Amblymora densepunctata =

Scientific classification
- Kingdom: Animalia
- Phylum: Arthropoda
- Class: Insecta
- Order: Coleoptera
- Suborder: Polyphaga
- Infraorder: Cucujiformia
- Family: Cerambycidae
- Genus: Amblymora
- Species: A. densepunctata

Binomial name
- Amblymora densepunctata (Breuning, 1963)

Synonyms
- Australothelais densepunctata Breuning, 1963

Species of beetle

Amblymora densepunctata is a species of beetle in the family Cerambycidae. It was described by Stephan von Breuning in 1963. It is known from Australia.
