= Asperula asterocephala =

Scientific classification
- Kingdom: Plantae
- Clade: Tracheophytes
- Clade: Angiosperms
- Clade: Eudicots
- Clade: Asterids
- Order: Gentianales
- Family: Rubiaceae
- Genus: Asperula
- Species: A. asterocephala

Binomial name
- Asperula asterocephala Bornm.

Species of plant in the coffee family

Asperula asterocephala is a deciduous species of perennial groundcover, and a flowering plant in the family Rubiaceae, known as Woodruff, and is endemic to Iraq, and was first named by Bornm.

== Description ==
Asperula asterocephala appears as a long, green plant, with small (1in) white flowers, on long, thin, green stems, it has compact, green leaves.

== Growth cycle ==
Asperula asterocephala flowers around May–June, and grows best in a rock garden, trough or crevice.
