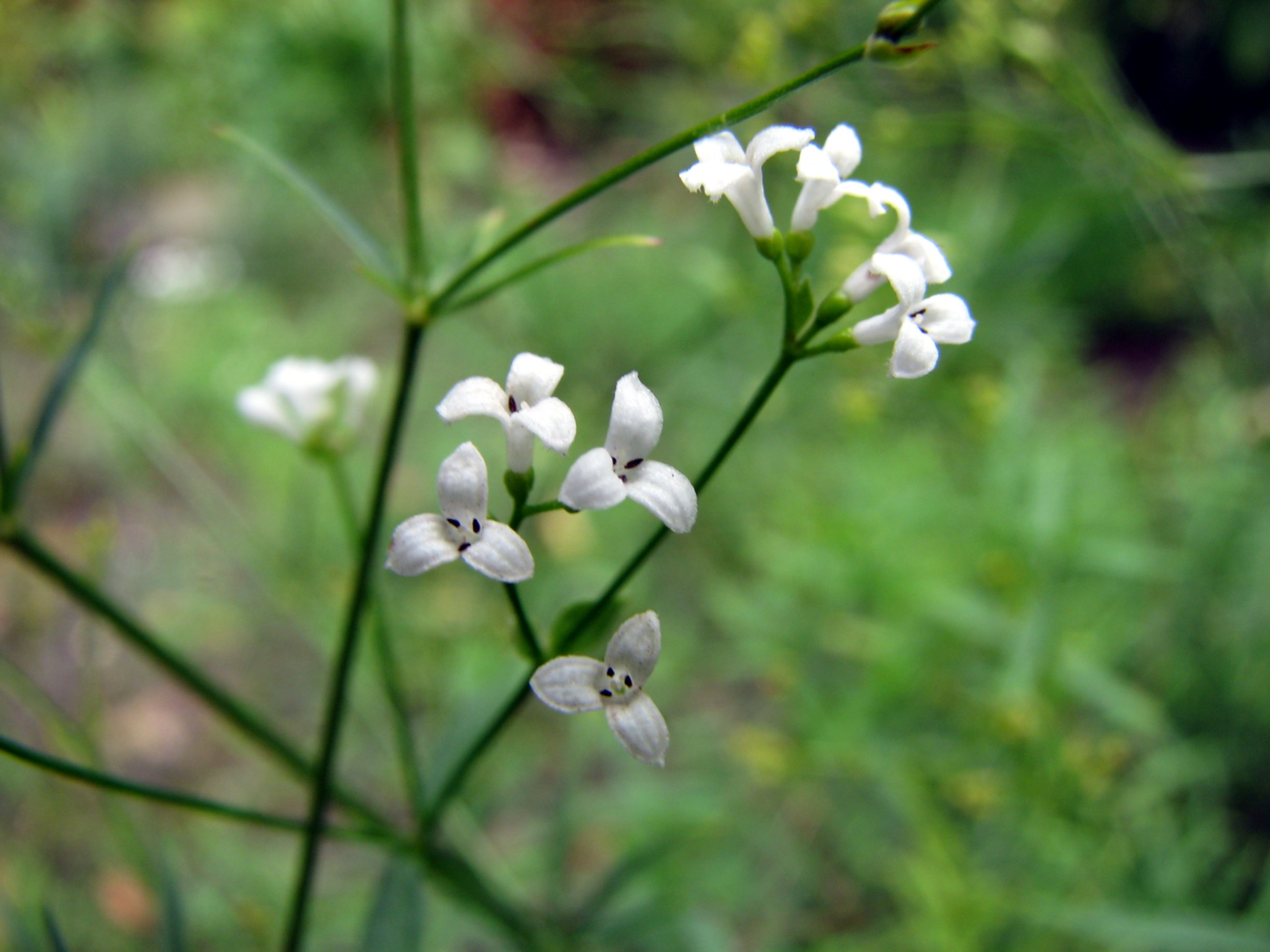
- Asperula tinctoria in flower

Scientific classification
- Kingdom: Plantae
- Clade: Tracheophytes
- Clade: Angiosperms
- Clade: Eudicots
- Clade: Asterids
- Order: Gentianales
- Family: Rubiaceae
- Genus: Asperula
- Species: A. tinctoria

Binomial name
- Asperula tinctoria L.

Synonyms
- Galium tinctorium (L.) Scop.; Asterophyllum tinctorium (L.) Schimp. & Spenn. in F.C.L.Spenner; Cynanchica tinctoria (L.) Fourr.; Galium triandrum Hyl.

= Asperula tinctoria =

Dyer's woodruff

Species of plant

Asperula tinctoria, common name dyer's woodruff, is a plant in the family Rubiaceae, a native of much of northern and central Europe from France to Russia and also of Western Siberia.

== Uses ==
The root was used by the ancient Greeks and Romans to make a red dye for clothing, but was less productive than the more widely used madder Rubia tinctorum.
