= Asperula wimmeriana =

Scientific classification
- Kingdom: Plantae
- Clade: Tracheophytes
- Clade: Angiosperms
- Clade: Eudicots
- Clade: Asterids
- Order: Gentianales
- Family: Rubiaceae
- Genus: Asperula
- Species: A. wimmeriana

Binomial name
- Asperula wimmeriana Airy Shaw & Turrill

Species of plant

Asperula wimmeriana is a species of flowering plant in the family Rubiaceae. It was first described in 1928 and is endemic to south east Australia.
