= Asperula pusilla =

Scientific classification
- Kingdom: Plantae
- Clade: Tracheophytes
- Clade: Angiosperms
- Clade: Eudicots
- Clade: Asterids
- Order: Gentianales
- Family: Rubiaceae
- Genus: Asperula
- Species: A. pusilla

Binomial name
- Asperula pusilla Hook.f.

Species of plant

Asperula pusilla, commonly known as alpine woodruff, is a species of flowering plant in the family Rubiaceae. It is a perennial herb that is endemic to Australia.
