= Asperula assamica =

Scientific classification
- Kingdom: Plantae
- Clade: Tracheophytes
- Clade: Angiosperms
- Clade: Eudicots
- Clade: Asterids
- Order: Gentianales
- Family: Rubiaceae
- Genus: Asperula
- Species: A. assamica

Binomial name
- Asperula assamica Meisn

Species of plant in the coffee family

Asperula assamica is a deciduous species of perennial groundcover, and a flowering plant in the family Rubiaceae, known as Woodruff, and is endemic to Assam, East Himalayas, and was first named by Meisn.

== Description ==
Asperula assamica appears as a long green heather-like plant, with small (1 inch or 25 millimetres) white flowers, on long, rough, woody stems, it has compact small, green, needle-like, leaves.

== Growth cycle ==
Asperula assamica flowers around May–June, and grows best in a rock garden, trough or crevice.
