= Amblymora pseudoconferta =

Scientific classification
- Kingdom: Animalia
- Phylum: Arthropoda
- Class: Insecta
- Order: Coleoptera
- Suborder: Polyphaga
- Infraorder: Cucujiformia
- Family: Cerambycidae
- Genus: Amblymora
- Species: A. pseudoconferta

Binomial name
- Amblymora pseudoconferta Breuning, 1939

Species of beetle

Amblymora pseudoconferta is a species of beetle in the family Cerambycidae. It was described by Stephan von Breuning in 1939. It is known from the Celebes Islands.
