= Amblymora instabilis =

Scientific classification
- Domain: Eukaryota
- Kingdom: Animalia
- Phylum: Arthropoda
- Class: Insecta
- Order: Coleoptera
- Suborder: Polyphaga
- Infraorder: Cucujiformia
- Family: Cerambycidae
- Genus: Amblymora
- Species: A. instabilis

Binomial name
- Amblymora instabilis Pascoe, 1867

Species of beetle

Amblymora instabilis is a species of beetle in the family Cerambycidae. It was described by Pascoe in 1867. It is known from Papua New Guinea.
