= Amblymora baloghi =

Scientific classification
- Kingdom: Animalia
- Phylum: Arthropoda
- Class: Insecta
- Order: Coleoptera
- Suborder: Polyphaga
- Infraorder: Cucujiformia
- Family: Cerambycidae
- Genus: Amblymora
- Species: A. baloghi

Binomial name
- Amblymora baloghi Breuning, 1975

Species of beetle

Amblymora baloghi is a species of beetle in the family Cerambycidae. It was described by Stephan von Breuning in 1975. It is known from Papua New Guinea.
