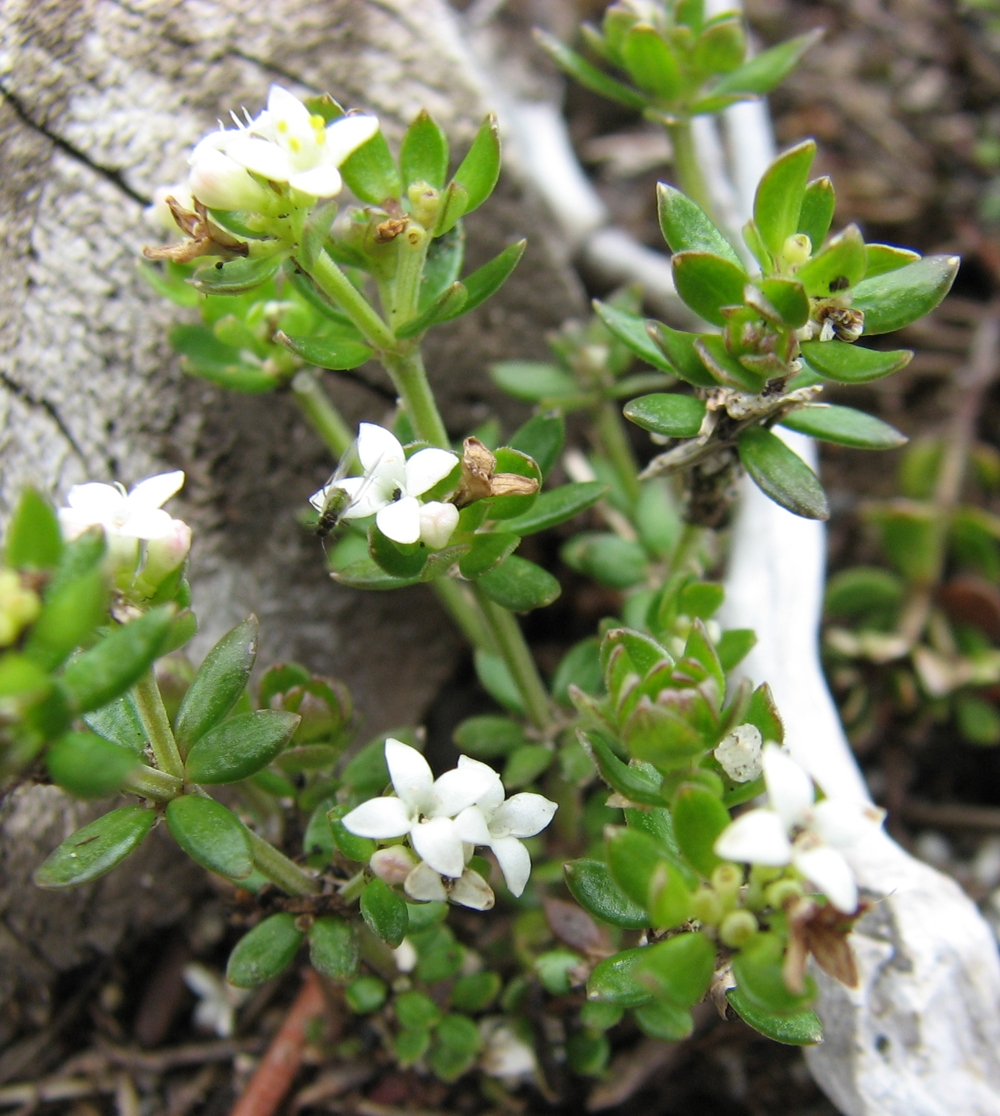
- Asperula gunnii, Baw Baw National Park, Victoria

Scientific classification
- Kingdom: Plantae
- Clade: Tracheophytes
- Clade: Angiosperms
- Clade: Eudicots
- Clade: Asterids
- Order: Gentianales
- Family: Rubiaceae
- Genus: Asperula
- Species: A. gunnii

Binomial name
- Asperula gunnii Hook.f.

Synonyms
- Asperula oligantha var. gunnii (Hook.f.) Maiden & Betche nom. illeg. Asperula gunnii var. curta (Hook.f.) Airy Shaw & Turrill; Galium curtum Hook.f.

= Asperula gunnii =

Species of plant

Asperula gunnii, the mountain woodruff, is a species of flowering plant in the family Rubiaceae. It is a perennial herb that is endemic to Australia.

== Description ==
Leaves are usually arranged in whorls of 4 to 6 and are 4 to 8 mm long and 2.5 mm wide with pointed ends. White flowers are produced in summer in terminal or axillary cymes. Male flowers are around 2 mm long and female flowers are 3 mm long. These are followed by 1 to 2 mm long black fruits.

== Distribution and habitat ==
Asperula gunnii occurs in damp or swampy conditions in grasslands or wooded areas at high altitudes in South Australia, Victoria, Tasmania and New South Wales.

== Taxonomy ==
Asperula gunnii was first formally described by the English botanist Joseph Dalton Hooker in 1847 based on plant material collected by Ronald Gunn near the Nive River in Tasmania in 1840.
