= Asperula taygetea =

Scientific classification
- Kingdom: Plantae
- Clade: Tracheophytes
- Clade: Angiosperms
- Clade: Eudicots
- Clade: Asterids
- Order: Gentianales
- Family: Rubiaceae
- Genus: Asperula
- Species: A. taygetea

Binomial name
- Asperula taygetea Boiss. & Heldr.

Synonyms
- Asperula incana Bory & Chaub.

Species of plant in the coffee family

Asperula taygetea is a species of flowering plant in the family Rubiaceae. Asperula taygetea was first described in 1849 and is endemic to Greece.
