= Asperula ambleia =

Scientific classification
- Kingdom: Plantae
- Clade: Tracheophytes
- Clade: Angiosperms
- Clade: Eudicots
- Clade: Asterids
- Order: Gentianales
- Family: Rubiaceae
- Genus: Asperula
- Species: A. ambleia

Binomial name
- Asperula ambleia Airy Shaw

Species of plant in the coffee family

Asperula ambleia is a deciduous species of perennial groundcover, and a flowering plant in the family Rubiaceae, known as Stiff Woodruff, and is endemic from SE. Queensland to NE. Victoria in Australia, and was first named by Herbert Kenneth Airy Shaw.

== Description ==
Asperula ambleia appears as a long green heather-like plant, with small (1 inch or 25 millimetres) white flowers, on long, rough, woody stems, it has compact, green, needle-like leaves.

== Growth cycle ==
Asperula ambleia flowers around May–June, and grows best in a rock garden, trough or crevice.
