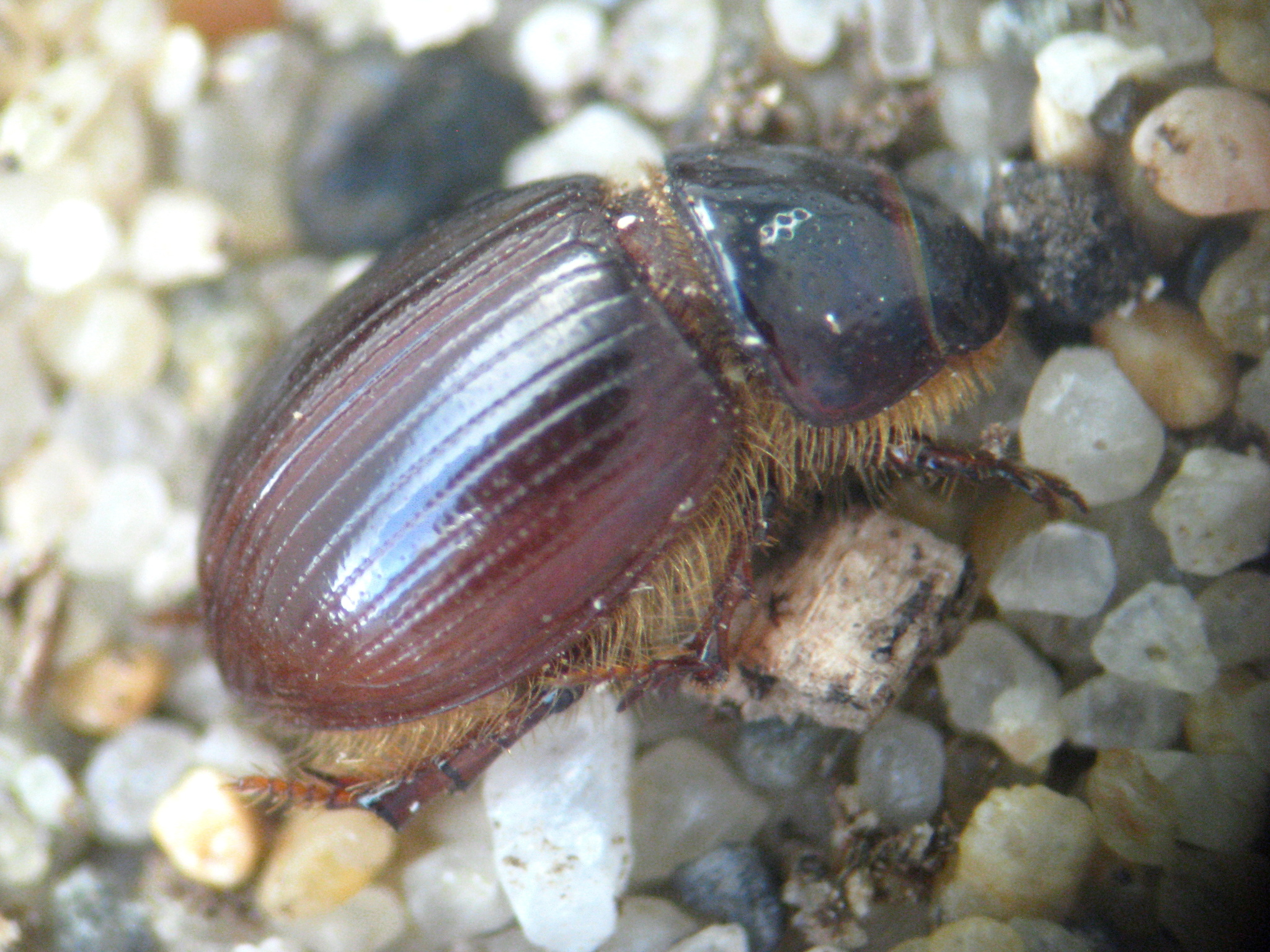

Conservation status
- Vulnerable (IUCN 2.3)

Scientific classification
- Kingdom: Animalia
- Phylum: Arthropoda
- Class: Insecta
- Order: Coleoptera
- Suborder: Polyphaga
- Infraorder: Scarabaeiformia
- Family: Scarabaeidae
- Genus: Aegialia
- Species: A. crescenta

Binomial name
- Aegialia crescenta Gordon & Cartwright, 1977

= Aegialia crescenta =

Species of beetle

Aegialia crescenta is a species of beetle in family Scarabaeidae. It is endemic to the United States.
