= Amblymora elongata =

Scientific classification
- Kingdom: Animalia
- Phylum: Arthropoda
- Clade: Pancrustacea
- Class: Insecta
- Order: Coleoptera
- Suborder: Polyphaga
- Infraorder: Cucujiformia
- Family: Cerambycidae
- Genus: Amblymora
- Species: A. elongata

Binomial name
- Amblymora elongata Breuning, 1943

Species of beetle

Amblymora elongata is a species of beetle in the family Cerambycidae. It was described by Stephan von Breuning in 1943. It is known from the Celebes Islands.
