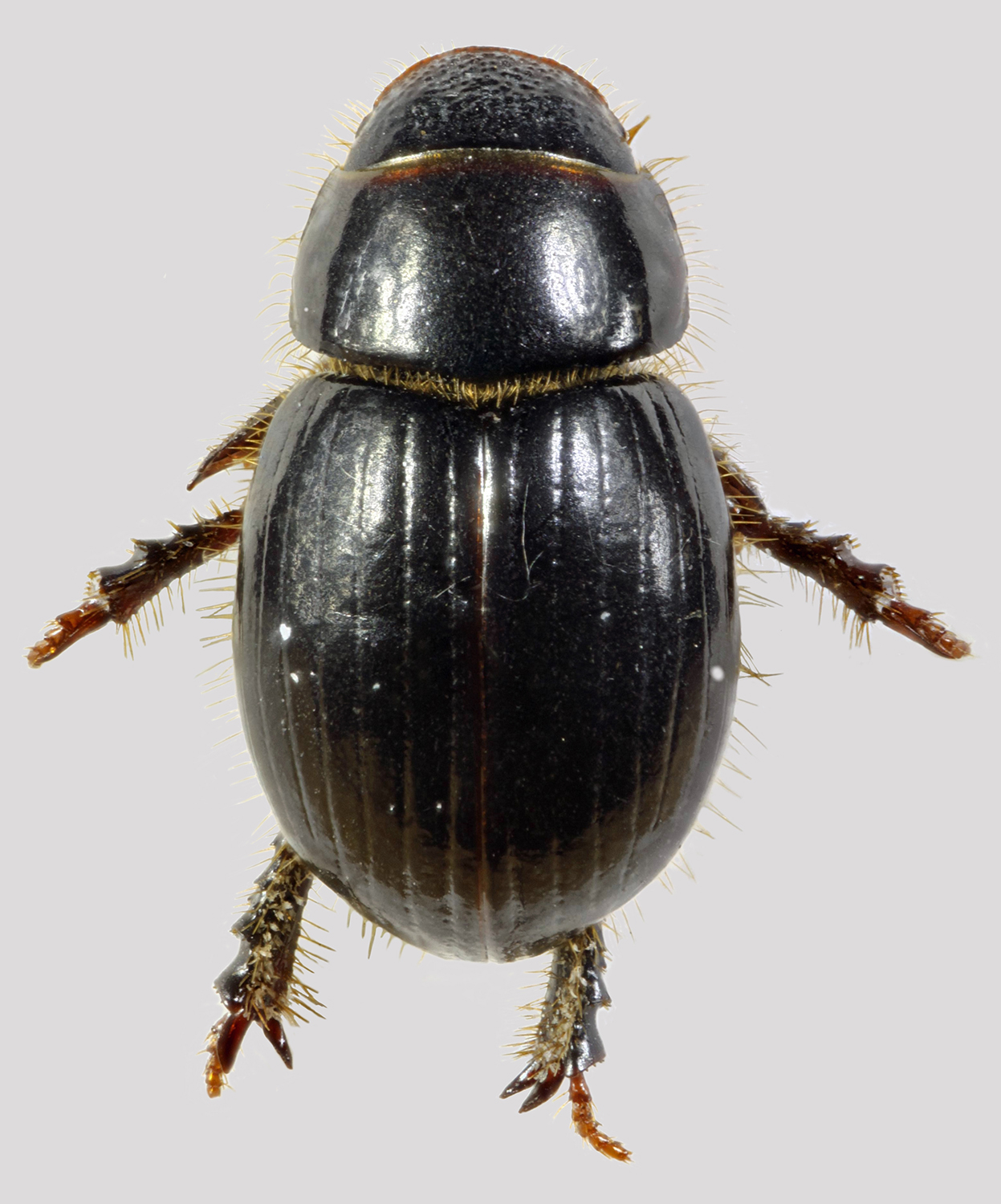
- Aegialia arenaria

Scientific classification
- Kingdom: Animalia
- Phylum: Arthropoda
- Clade: Pancrustacea
- Class: Insecta
- Order: Coleoptera
- Suborder: Polyphaga
- Infraorder: Scarabaeiformia
- Family: Scarabaeidae
- Tribe: Aegialiini
- Genus: Aegialia; Latreille, 1807

Synonyms
- Dimalia Mulsant and Rey, 1870

= Aegialia =

Genus of beetles

Aegialia is a genus of aphodiine dung beetles in the family Scarabaeidae.

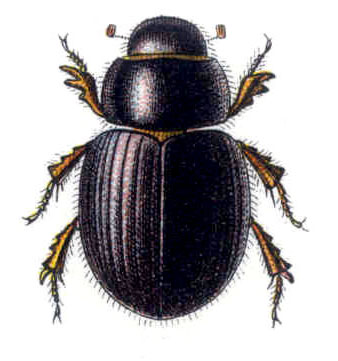
Aegialia arenaria

== Selected species ==
- Aegialia amplipunctata Gordon and Cartwright, 1988^{i c g}
- Aegialia arenaria (Fabricius, 1787)^{i c g b}
- Aegialia blanchardi Horn, 1887^{i c g b}
- Aegialia carri Gordon and Cartwright, 1988^{i c g}
- Aegialia cartwrighti Stebnicka, 1977^{i c g b}
- Aegialia clypeata (Say, 1824)^{c g}
- Aegialia concinna Gordon & Cartwright, 1977^{i c g b} (ciervo aegialian scarab)
- Aegialia conferta Horn, 1871^{i c g b}
- Aegialia convexa Fall, 1932^{i c g b}
- Aegialia crassa LeConte, 1857^{i c g}
- Aegialia crescenta Gordon & Cartwright, 1977^{i c g b} (crescent dunes aegialian scarab)
- Aegialia criddlei Brown, 1931^{i g}
- Aegialia cylindrica (Eschscholtz, 1822)^{i}
- Aegialia exarata Mannerheim, 1853^{i g}
- Aegialia hardyi Gordon and Cartwright, 1977^{i c g}
- Aegialia kelsoi Gordon and Cartwright, 1988^{i c g}
- Aegialia knighti Gordon and Rust, 1997^{i c g}
- Aegialia lacustris Leconte, 1850^{i g b}
- Aegialia latispina Leconte, 1878^{i c g b}
- Aegialia magnifica Gordon and Cartwright, 1977^{i c g}
- Aegialia mcclevei Gordon, 1990^{i c g}
- Aegialia nana Brown, 1931^{i g}
- Aegialia nigrella Brown, 1931^{i g}
- Aegialia nitida Waterhouse, 1875^{c g}
- Aegialia opaca Brown, 1931^{i g}
- Aegialia opifex Horn, 1887^{i c g b}
- Aegialia punctata Brown, 1931^{i c g}
- Aegialia rupta Scudder, 1890^{c g}
- Aegialia shimeki Lago & Freese, 2016^{c g}
- Aegialia spinosa Gordon & Cartwright, 1988^{i c g b}
- Aegialia terminalis Brown, 1931^{i g}

Data sources: i = ITIS, c = Catalogue of Life, g = GBIF, b = Bugguide.net

== See also ==
- Queen consort of Diomedes, Aegialia of ancient Argos
