= Amblymora uniformis =

Scientific classification
- Kingdom: Animalia
- Phylum: Arthropoda
- Class: Insecta
- Order: Coleoptera
- Suborder: Polyphaga
- Infraorder: Cucujiformia
- Family: Cerambycidae
- Genus: Amblymora
- Species: A. uniformis

Binomial name
- Amblymora uniformis Jordan, 1894

Species of beetle

Amblymora uniformis is a species of beetle in the family Cerambycidae. It was described by Karl Jordan in 1894. It is known from Moluccas.
