= Amblymora v-flava =

Scientific classification
- Domain: Eukaryota
- Kingdom: Animalia
- Phylum: Arthropoda
- Class: Insecta
- Order: Coleoptera
- Suborder: Polyphaga
- Infraorder: Cucujiformia
- Family: Cerambycidae
- Genus: Amblymora
- Species: A. v-flava

Binomial name
- Amblymora v-flava Gilmour, 1950

Species of beetle

Amblymora v-flava is a species of beetle in the family Cerambycidae. It was described by Gilmour in 1950.
