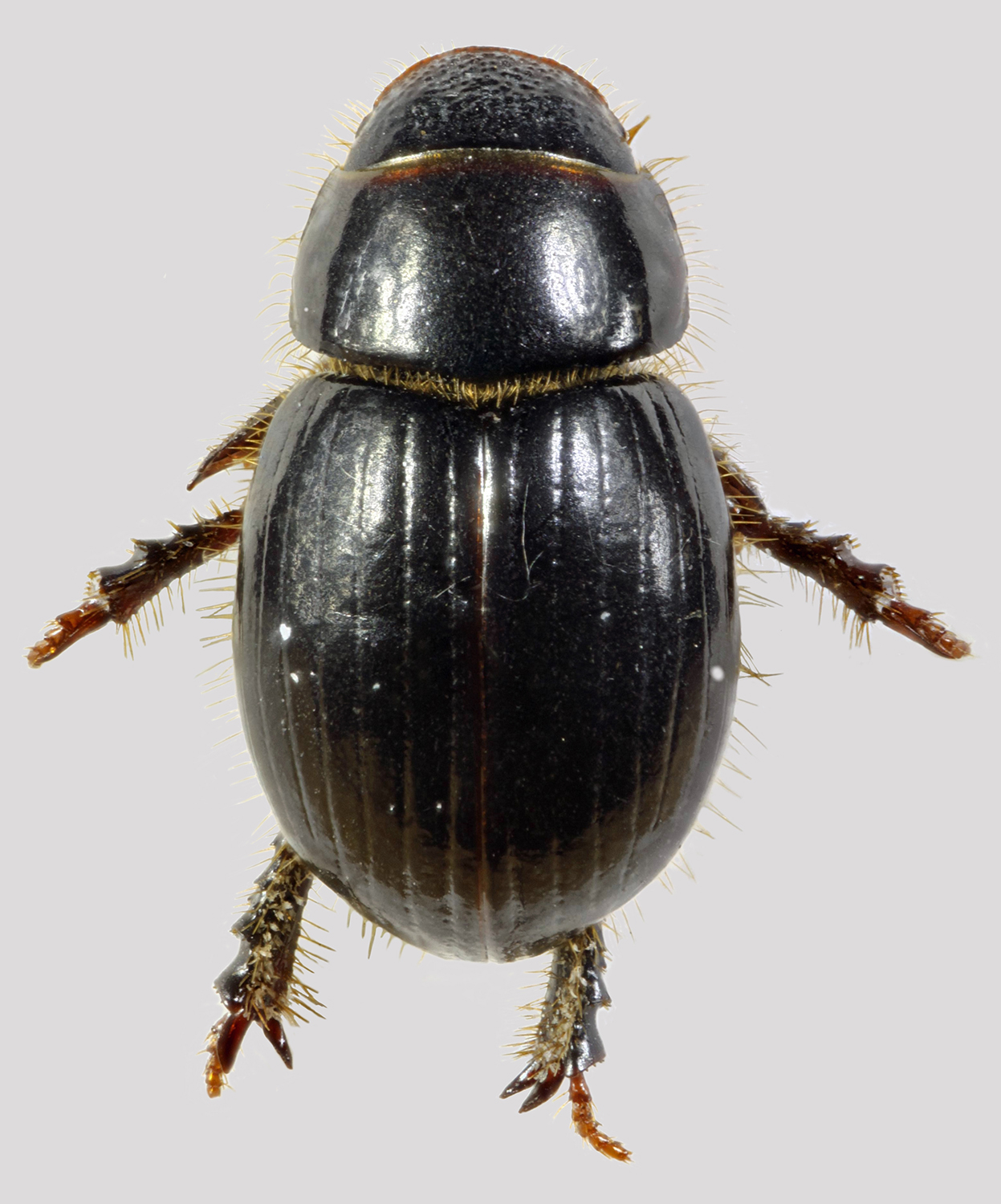
- Aegialia arenaria, Harlech dunes, North Wales 5,0 mm. (5,0-6,0 mm,)

Scientific classification
- Kingdom: Animalia
- Phylum: Arthropoda
- Clade: Pancrustacea
- Class: Insecta
- Order: Coleoptera
- Suborder: Polyphaga
- Infraorder: Scarabaeiformia
- Family: Scarabaeidae
- Genus: Aegialia
- Species: A. arenaria

Binomial name
- Aegialia arenaria (Fabricius, 1787)

= Aegialia arenaria =

Species of beetle

Aegialia arenaria, the dune scarab beetle, is a species of beetle in the family Scarabaeidae. It is found in the Palearctic and Nearctic. It is a coastal species found on sand dunes of western and northern Europe (Netherlands, Belgium, France (Nord-Pas-de-Calais), Germany, Denmark, Portugal, Spain, Britain, Ireland, Norway, Sweden, Finland) and in the Nearctic from Nova Scotia in Canada (Sable Island), to Massachusetts and New Hampshire.
