= Asperula xylorrhiza =

Scientific classification
- Kingdom: Plantae
- Clade: Tracheophytes
- Clade: Angiosperms
- Clade: Eudicots
- Clade: Asterids
- Order: Gentianales
- Family: Rubiaceae
- Genus: Asperula
- Species: A. xylorrhiza

Binomial name
- Asperula xylorrhiza Nábelek

Species of plant

Asperula xylorrhiza is a species of flowering plant in the family Rubiaceae. It is endemic to Turkey and Iraq.
