= Amblymora carinipennis =

Scientific classification
- Kingdom: Animalia
- Phylum: Arthropoda
- Class: Insecta
- Order: Coleoptera
- Suborder: Polyphaga
- Infraorder: Cucujiformia
- Family: Cerambycidae
- Genus: Amblymora
- Species: A. carinipennis

Binomial name
- Amblymora carinipennis Stephan von Breuning, 1974

Species of beetle

Amblymora carinipennis is a species of beetle in the family Cerambycidae. It was described by Breuning in 1974. It is known from the Celebes Islands.
