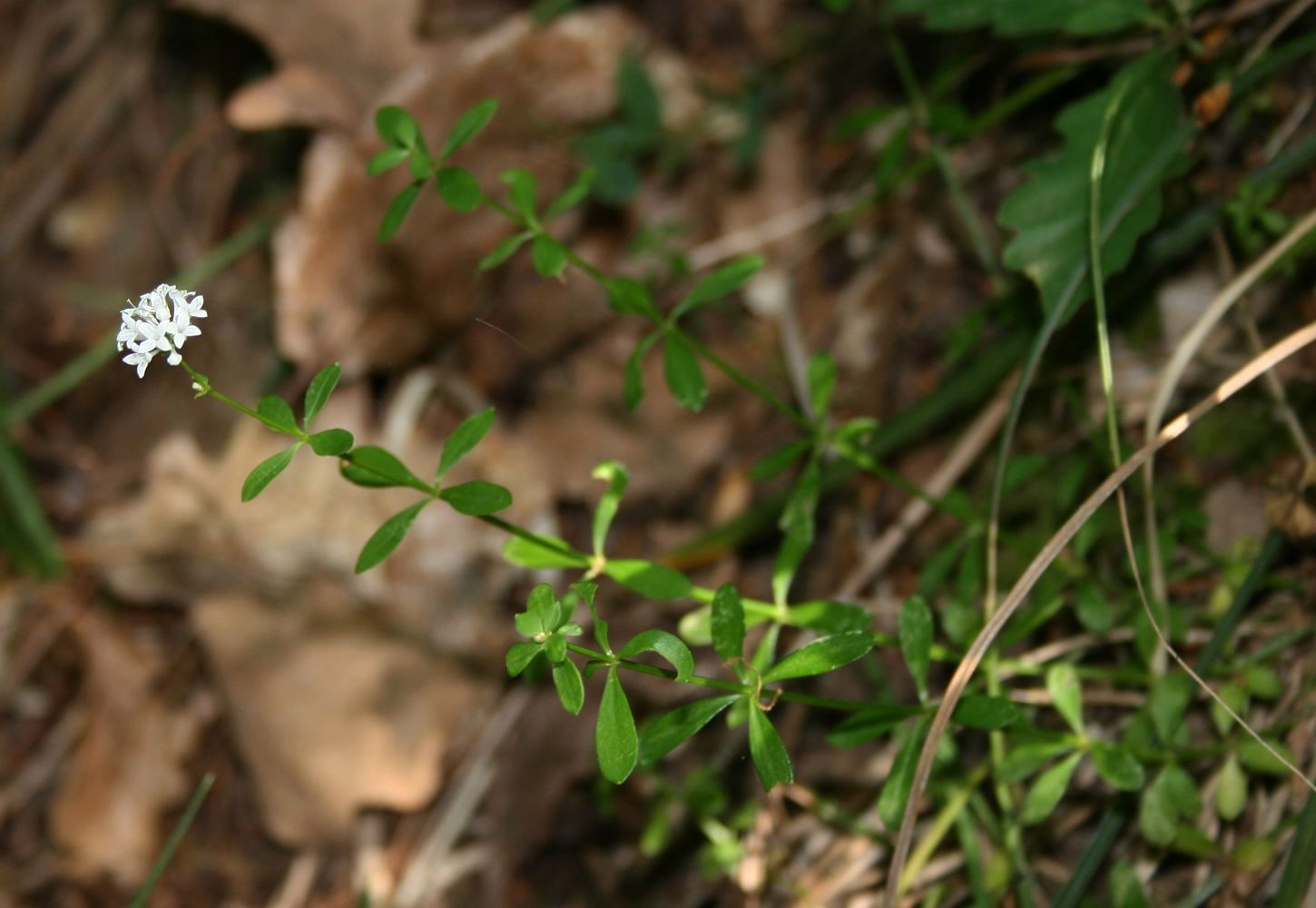
- Asperula involucrata

Scientific classification
- Kingdom: Plantae
- Clade: Tracheophytes
- Clade: Angiosperms
- Clade: Eudicots
- Clade: Asterids
- Order: Gentianales
- Family: Rubiaceae
- Genus: Asperula
- Species: A. involucrata

Binomial name
- Asperula involucrata Wahlenb.

= Asperula involucrata =

Species of plant

Asperula involucrata is a species of flowering plant in the family Rubiaceae.

== Description ==
Asperula involucrata is endemic to Bulgaria and Turkey.
