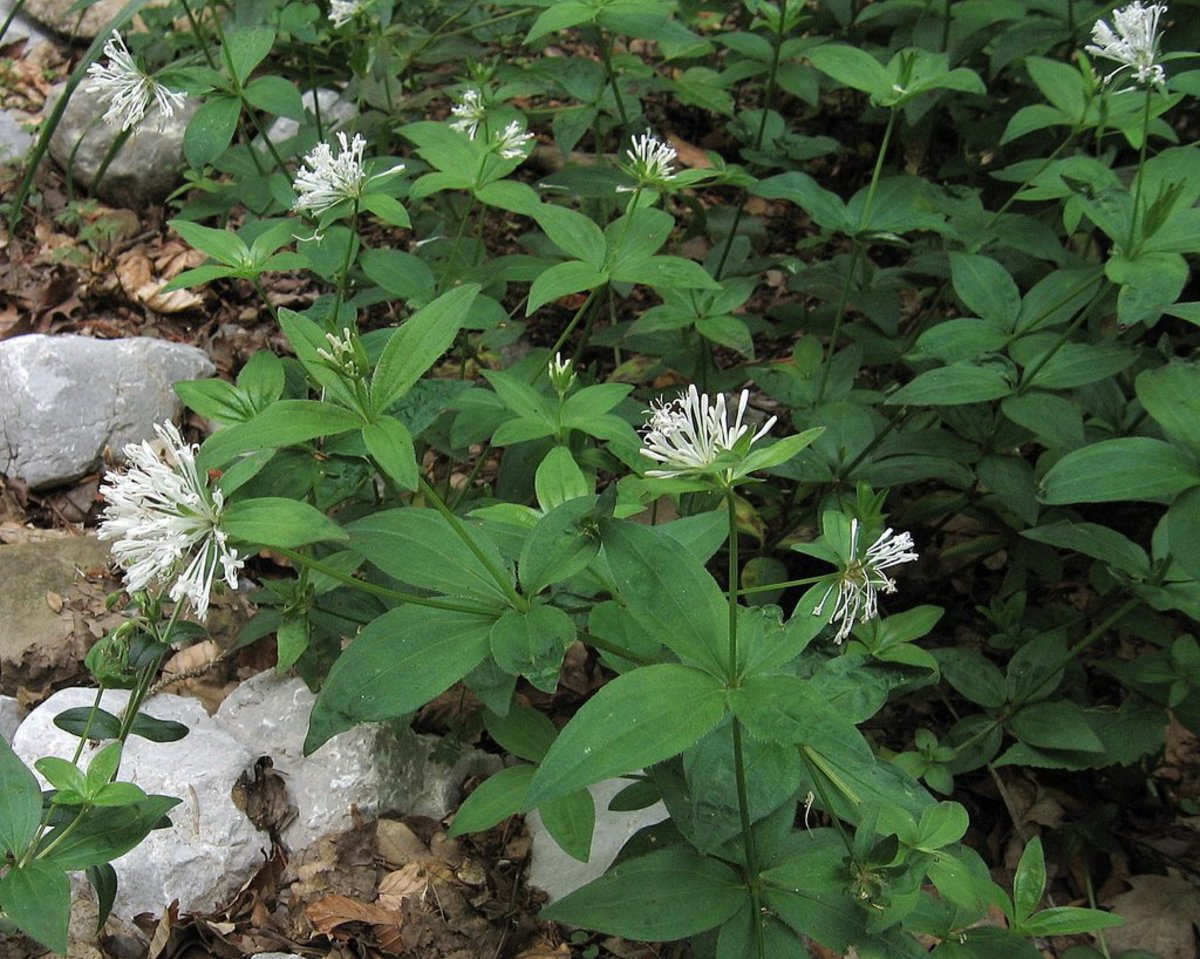

Scientific classification
- Kingdom: Plantae
- Clade: Tracheophytes
- Clade: Angiosperms
- Clade: Eudicots
- Clade: Asterids
- Order: Gentianales
- Family: Rubiaceae
- Genus: Asperula
- Species: A. taurina

Binomial name
- Asperula taurina L.

= Asperula taurina =

Species of plant

Asperula taurina is a species of flowering plant in the family Rubiaceae. It was first described in 1753 and is native to Albania, Austria, Bulgaria, France, Greece, Hungary, Iran, Italy, Crimea, Romania, Switzerland, Georgia, Armenia, Azerbaijan, Turkey, Slovenia, Croatia, Bosnia, Serbia, and Montenegro. It was also introduced to Denmark, Germany, and Great Britain.

== Taxonomy ==
Asperula taurina was described by the Swedish naturalist Carl Linnaeus in 1753 book Species Plantarum. There are three recognized subspecies: A. t. taurina, A. t. caucasica, and A. t. leucanthera. The species is known as Aspérule de Turin or Grande Croisette in French, Asperla da Turin in Raeto-Romance, Stellina cruciata in Italian, and Turiner Waldmeister in German.

== Description ==
The plant is a medium-sized herb that grows to heights of 20–60 cm and has an erect, hairy stem. The leaves grow in whorls of four and are lanceolate to oval, with a length of 3 cm and a width of over 4 mm. The flowers are white with corollas over 8 mm long and grow in dense bunches at the end of a branch.

The related Asperula laevigata has smaller leaves and shorter corollas less than 3 mm long. Galium rubioides is a larger plant that grows as tall as 1 metre, with longer leaves and a denser inflorescence.

== Distribution and habitat ==
It has a large range and is found in many parts of Europe. It is native to France, Italy, Switzerland, Austria, Slovenia, Hungary, Romania, the Balkans, Crimea, Turkey, Iran, and the Caucasus. It has been introduced to Germany, Poland, Great Britain, Denmark, and Ireland. A former record from Spain is thought to be erroneous.

It is a subalpine plant. In France, it is rare and prefers undergrowth and forest edge in mountainous areas with basic soil.

== Ecology ==
Asperula taurina is a perennial herb that grows rhizomes and is hermaphroditic. It is pollinated by insects.
