= Amblymora fumosa =

Scientific classification
- Domain: Eukaryota
- Kingdom: Animalia
- Phylum: Arthropoda
- Class: Insecta
- Order: Coleoptera
- Suborder: Polyphaga
- Infraorder: Cucujiformia
- Family: Cerambycidae
- Genus: Amblymora
- Species: A. fumosa

Binomial name
- Amblymora fumosa Pascoe, 1867

Species of beetle

Amblymora fumosa is a species of beetle in the family Cerambycidae. It was described by Pascoe in 1867.
