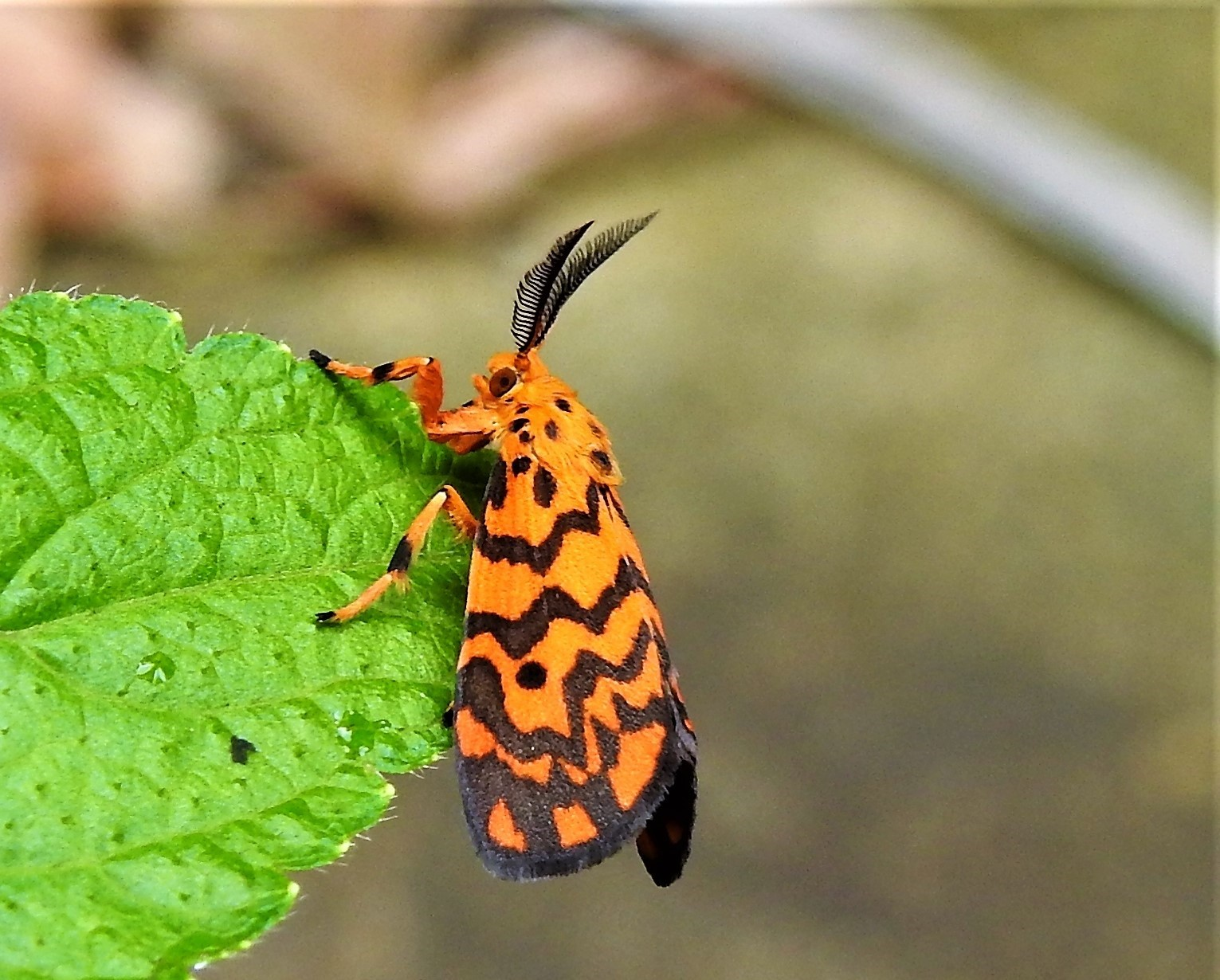
- Nepita conferta

Scientific classification
- Kingdom: Animalia
- Phylum: Arthropoda
- Clade: Pancrustacea
- Class: Insecta
- Order: Lepidoptera
- Superfamily: Noctuoidea
- Family: Erebidae
- Subfamily: Arctiinae
- Genus: Nepita; Moore, 1860
- Species: N. conferta

Binomial name
- Nepita conferta (Walker, 1854)

Synonyms
- Asura conferta Walker, 1854; Pitane conferta Walker, 1854; Nepita anila Moore, [1860]; Nepita signata Walker, [1865]; Nepita aegrota Butler, 1877; Nepita ochracea Butler, 1877; Nepita limbata Butler, 1877; Nepita conferta var. fusca Hampson, 1893

= Nepita =

Genus of moths

Nepita is a monotypic genus of moth in the subfamily Arctiinae erected by Frederic Moore in 1860. Its only species, Nepita conferta, the footman moth, was first described by Francis Walker in 1854. It is found in India and Sri Lanka.

== Description ==
Palpi porrect (extending forward), extending beyond the frons, and fringed with hair below. Antennae roughly scaled. Tibia with long spurs. Forewings are broad and short. Veins 3 to 5 from close to angle of cell and vein 6 from below upper angle. Veins 7 to 9 stalked and vein 11 anastomosing with vein 12. Hindwings with stalked vein 4 and 5 and 6 and 7. From 8 from beyond middle of cell.

Male antennae bipectinate with short branches. Head and thorax orange, where thorax with black spots. Abdomen black, orange below and at extremity. Forewings orange with some black marks at base. Antemedial and medial bands are curved and waved, which coalesce at median vein. There is a black spot on discocellulars. The post medial band is waved and excurved round end of cell. A series of submarginal spots and streaks present, often conjoined into a band. Margin and cilia are black. Hindwings have orange base, and a broad marginal black band. The spots and streaks differ in each region of the moth survives, where the limbata and ochracea forms have narrow bands on forewings. Forms conferta, aegrota, anila has broad bands on forewings. fusca from Sri Lanka is brown suffused. These differences gave earlier division of the species into many binomials.

Larva purplish black and short, swollen in shape. Each somite thickly covered with long black hair tufts. First, seventh and anal somites possess dorsal orange marks. There is a slender line runs from the seventh to the anal somite.

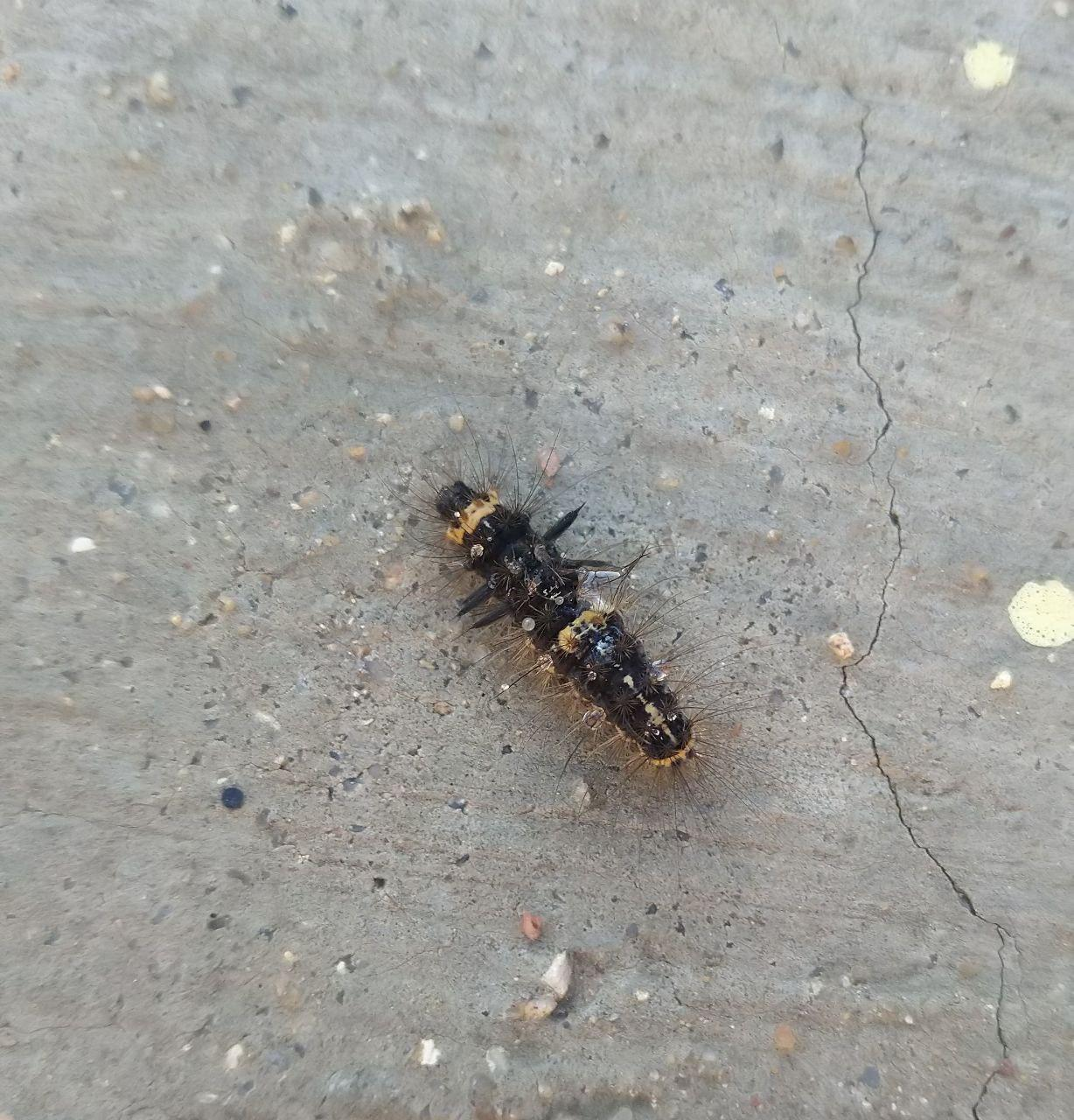
caterpillar

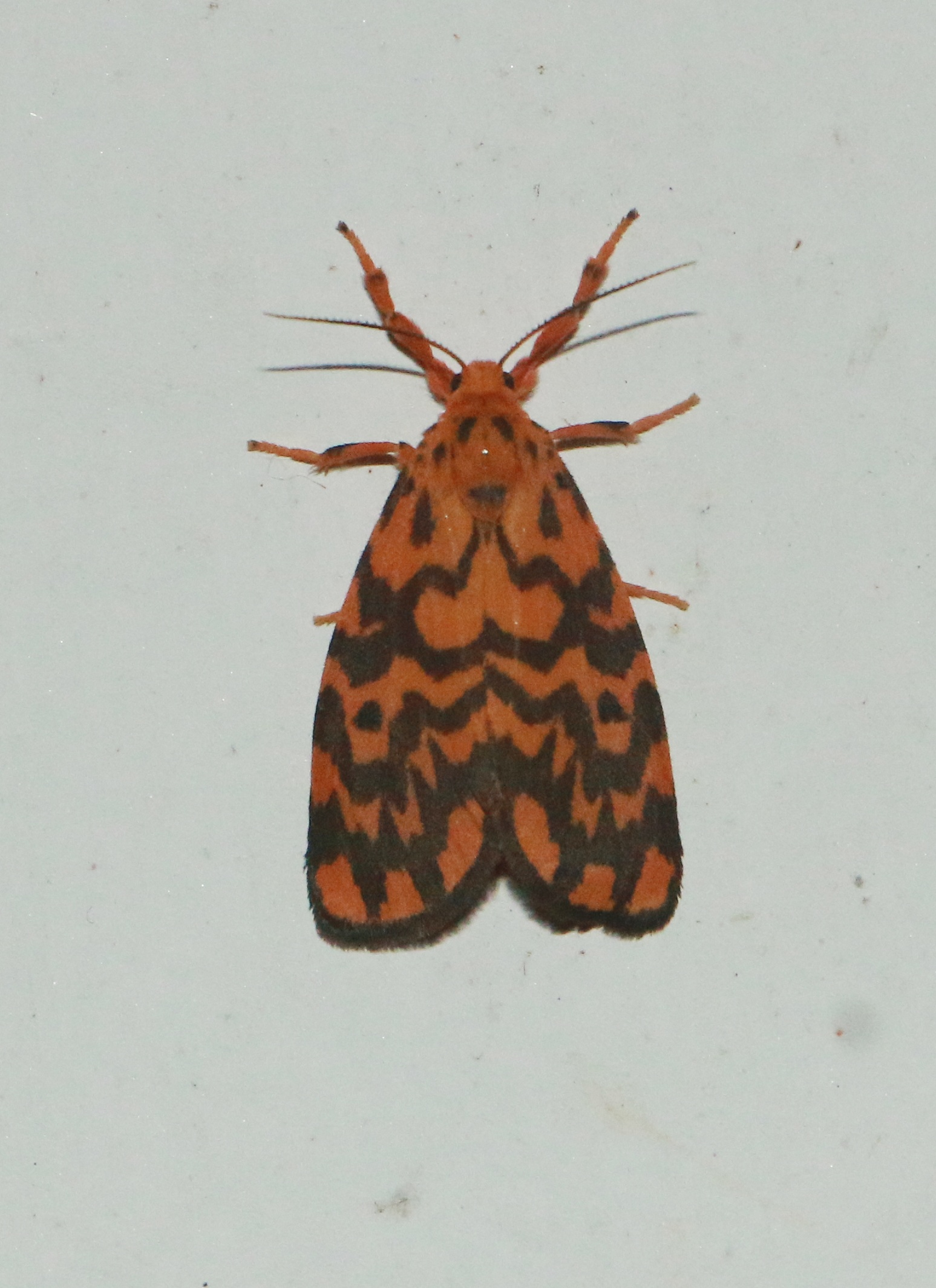

== Ecology ==
They are often found in wet, moist habitats and larva mostly feed on mosses and lichen. The larva was recorded as a minor pest of brinjal. They were observed as hosts of Glyptapanteles species of parasitoid wasps. It is highly adaptable to domestic conditions, caterpillars are found on moist walls in rainy seasons, sometimes in large numbers.
