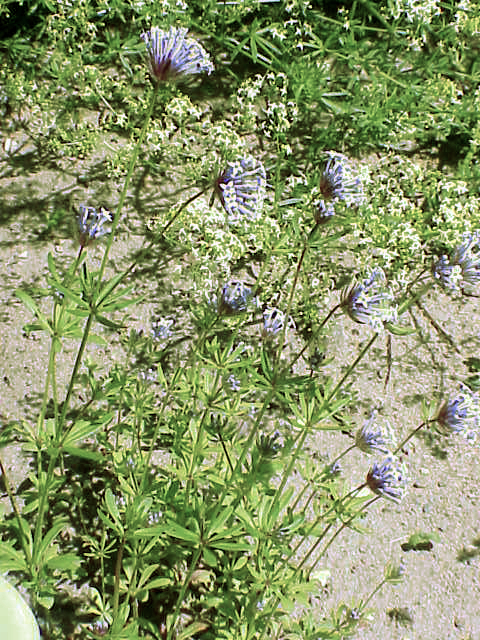

Scientific classification
- Kingdom: Plantae
- Clade: Tracheophytes
- Clade: Angiosperms
- Clade: Eudicots
- Clade: Asterids
- Order: Gentianales
- Family: Rubiaceae
- Genus: Asperula
- Species: A. arvensis

Binomial name
- Asperula arvensis L.

= Asperula arvensis =

Species of plant

Asperula arvensis, known as blue woodruff, is a species of flowering plant in the family Rubiaceae. It belongs to the genus Asperula. It is native to most of Europe and also North Africa, and southwest Asia from Turkey to Kyrgyzstan.
