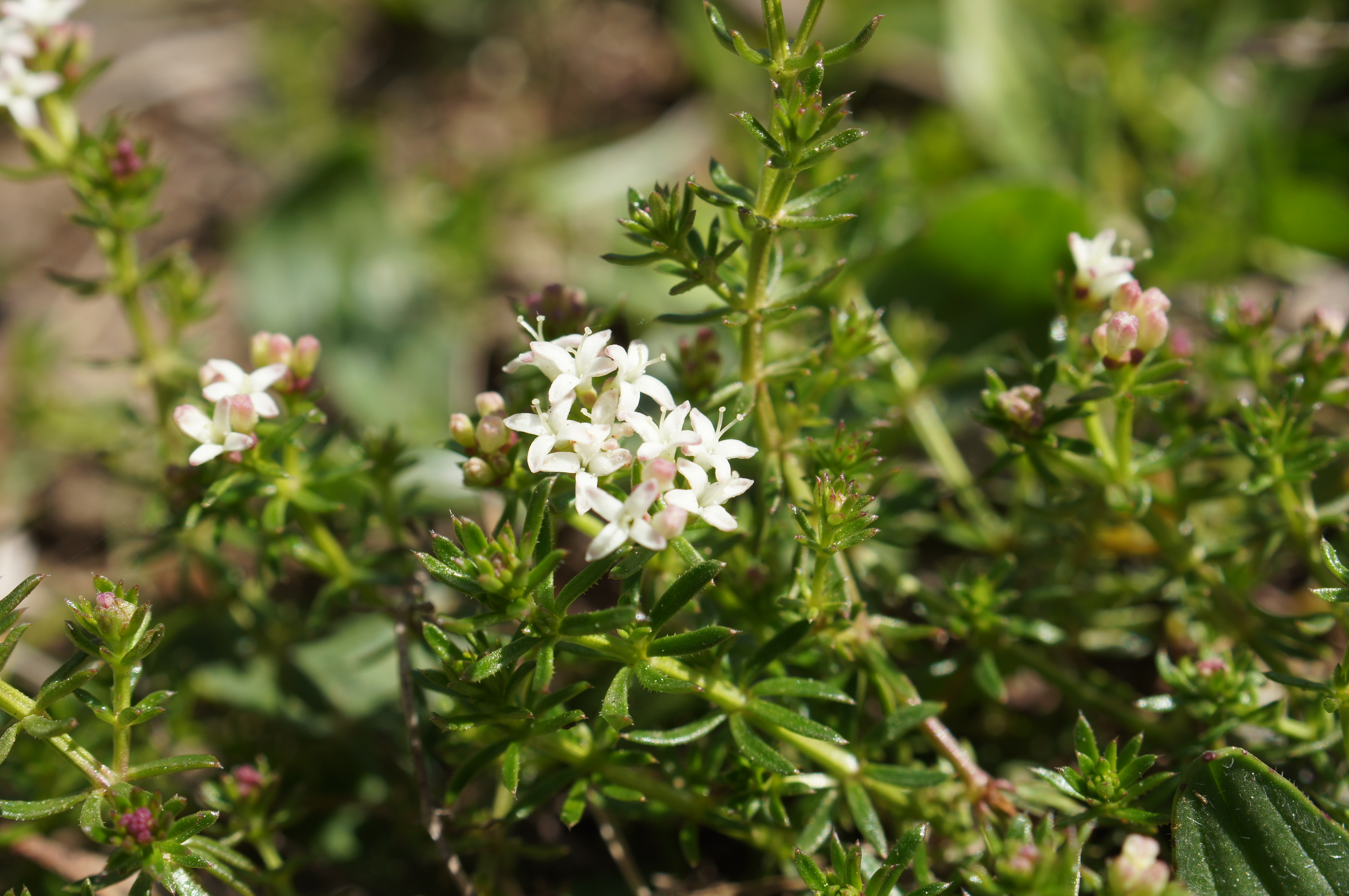

Scientific classification
- Kingdom: Plantae
- Clade: Tracheophytes
- Clade: Angiosperms
- Clade: Eudicots
- Clade: Asterids
- Order: Gentianales
- Family: Rubiaceae
- Genus: Asperula
- Species: A. conferta

Binomial name
- Asperula conferta Hook.f.
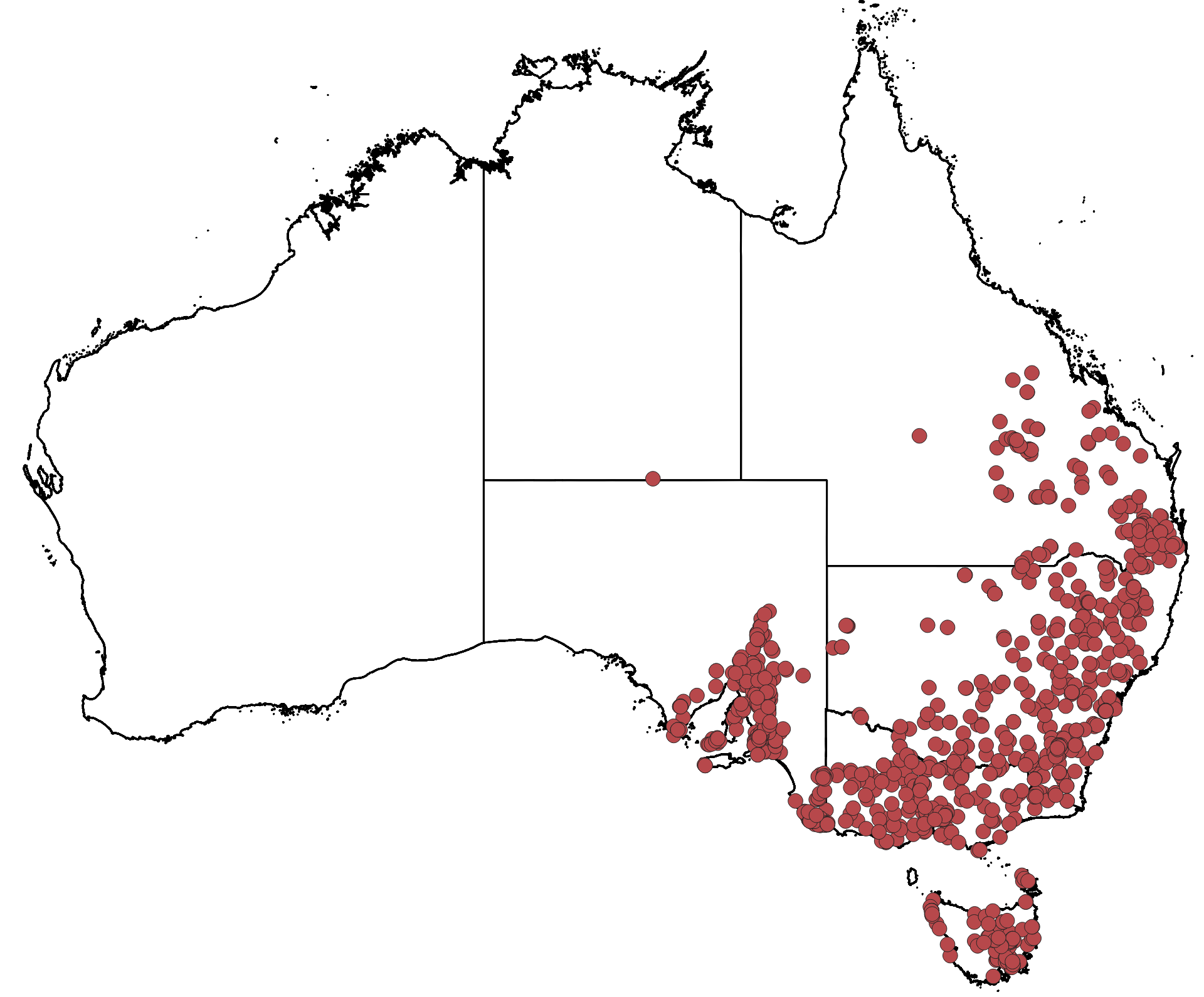
- Occurrence data from AVH

= Asperula conferta =

Species of plant

Asperula conferta is a species of flowering plant in the family Rubiaceae. It is Australian endemic distributed across Queensland, New South Wales, Victoria, Tasmania, South Australia and the Northern Territory.

== Description ==
Asperula conferta is a low spreading herb. It can grow up to 30 centimeters in height with leaves up to 16 mm in length. The leaves are in whorls of 5–6. Asperula conferta has tiny white flowers in summer. The flowers are typically 2-3 millimeters long.

== Ecology ==
It is common and widespread in woodland, forest and grassland.

== Gallery ==
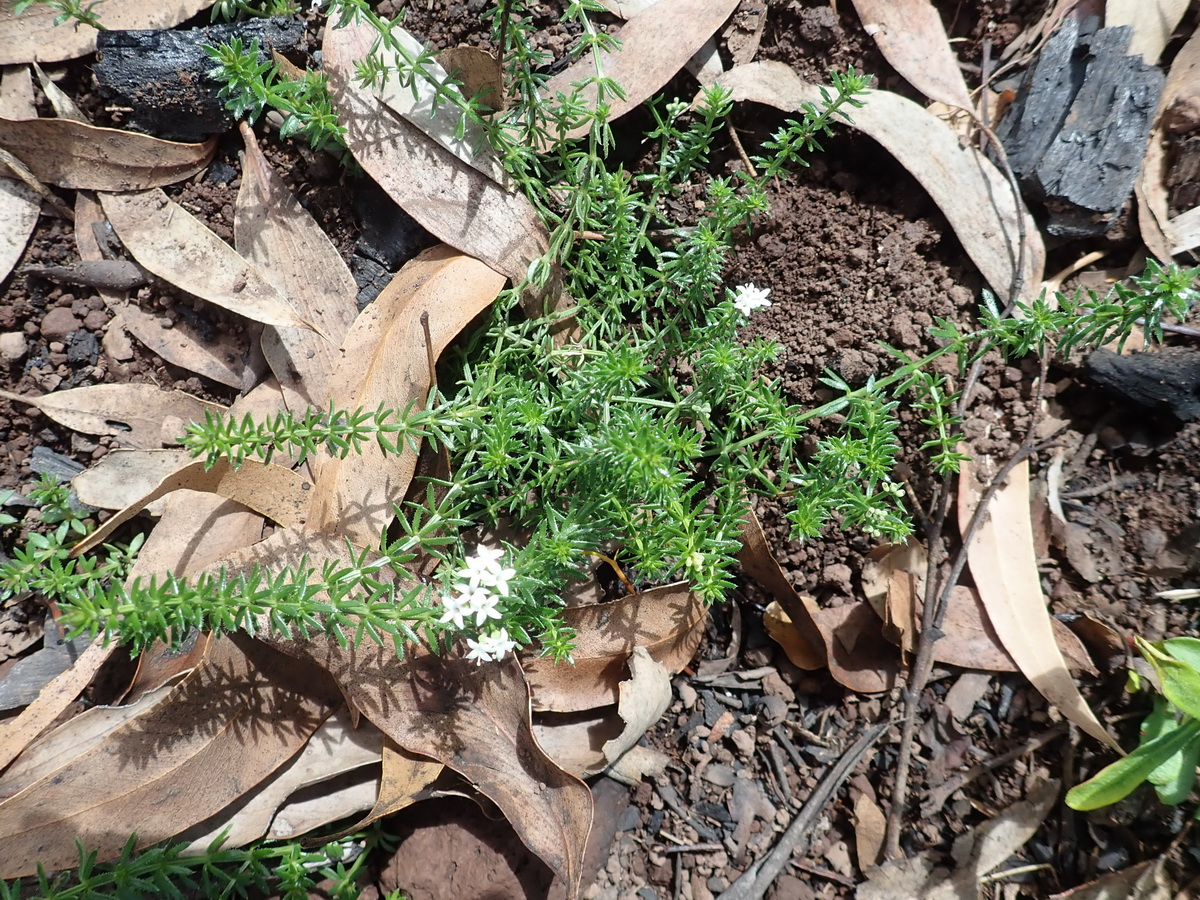
Plant

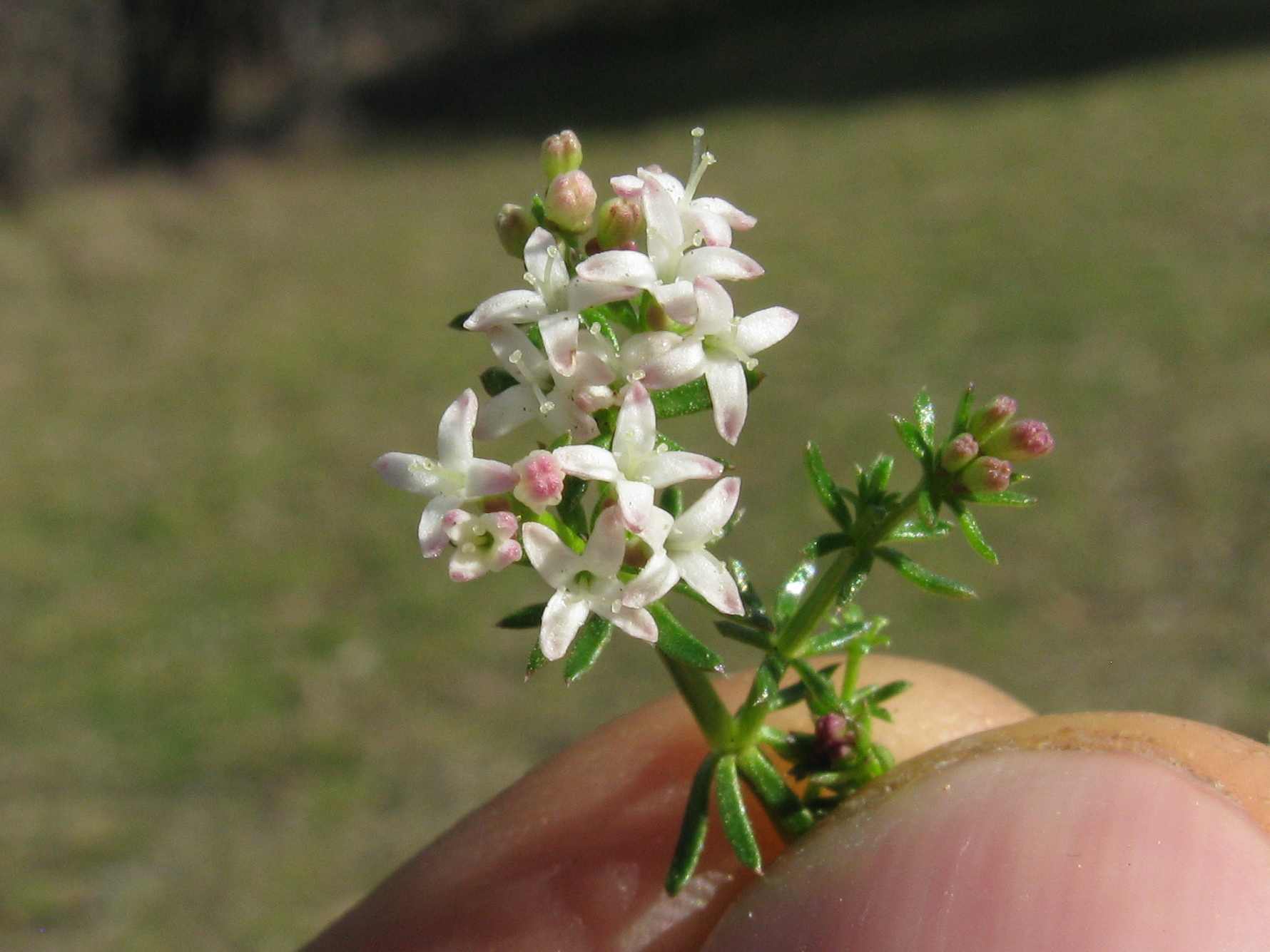
Flowers

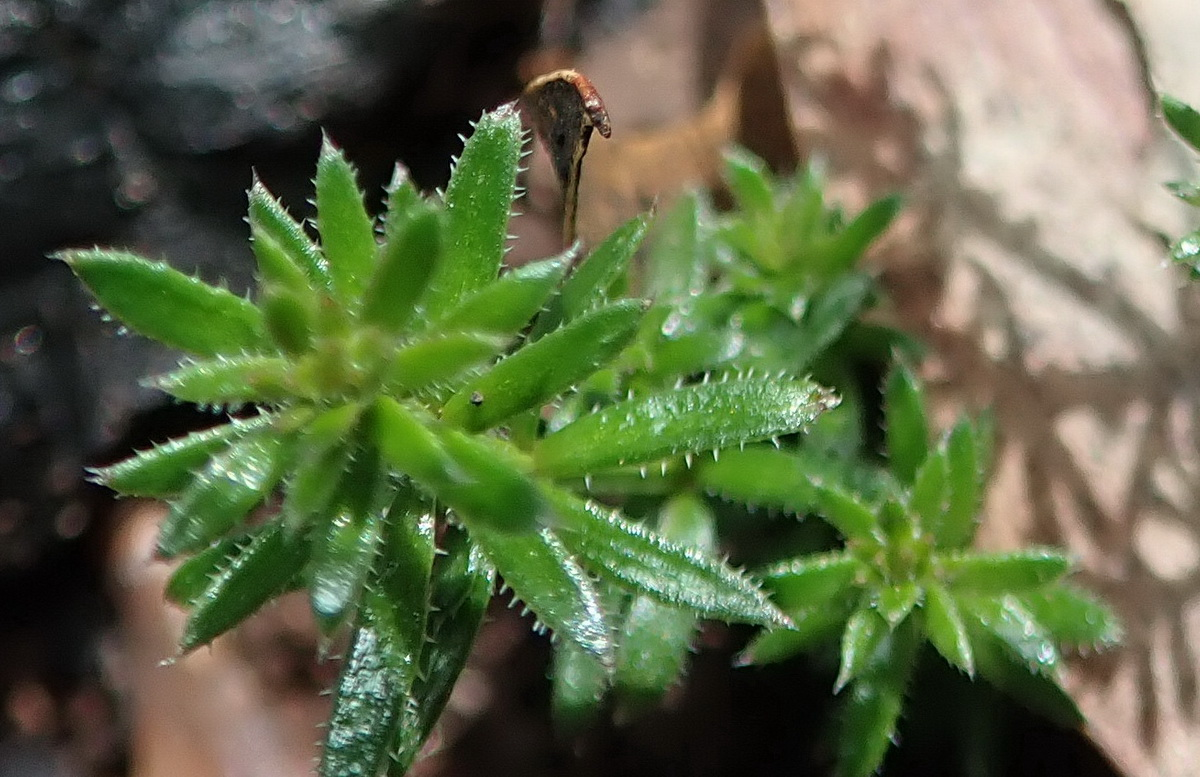
Leaves

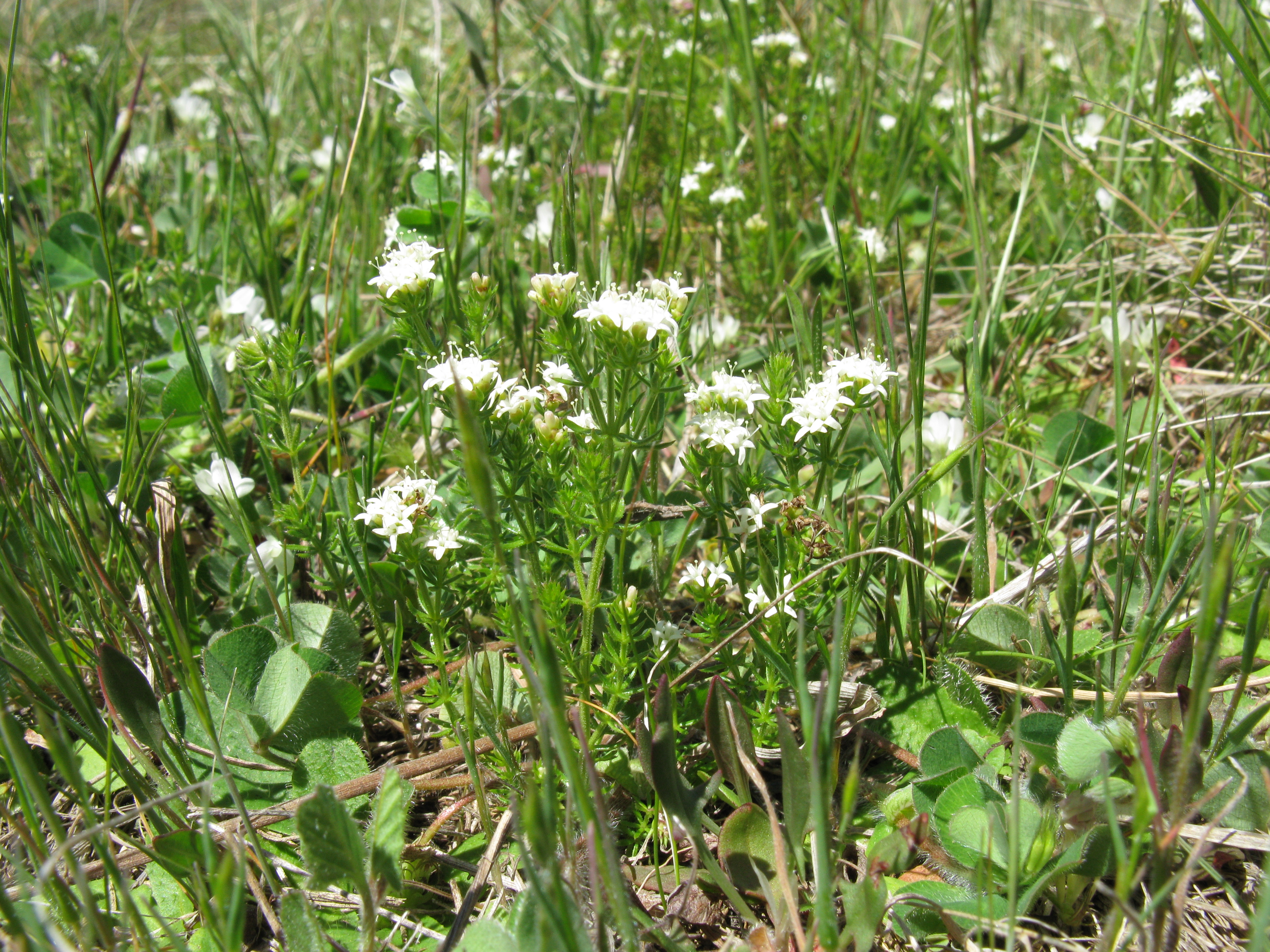
Habitat

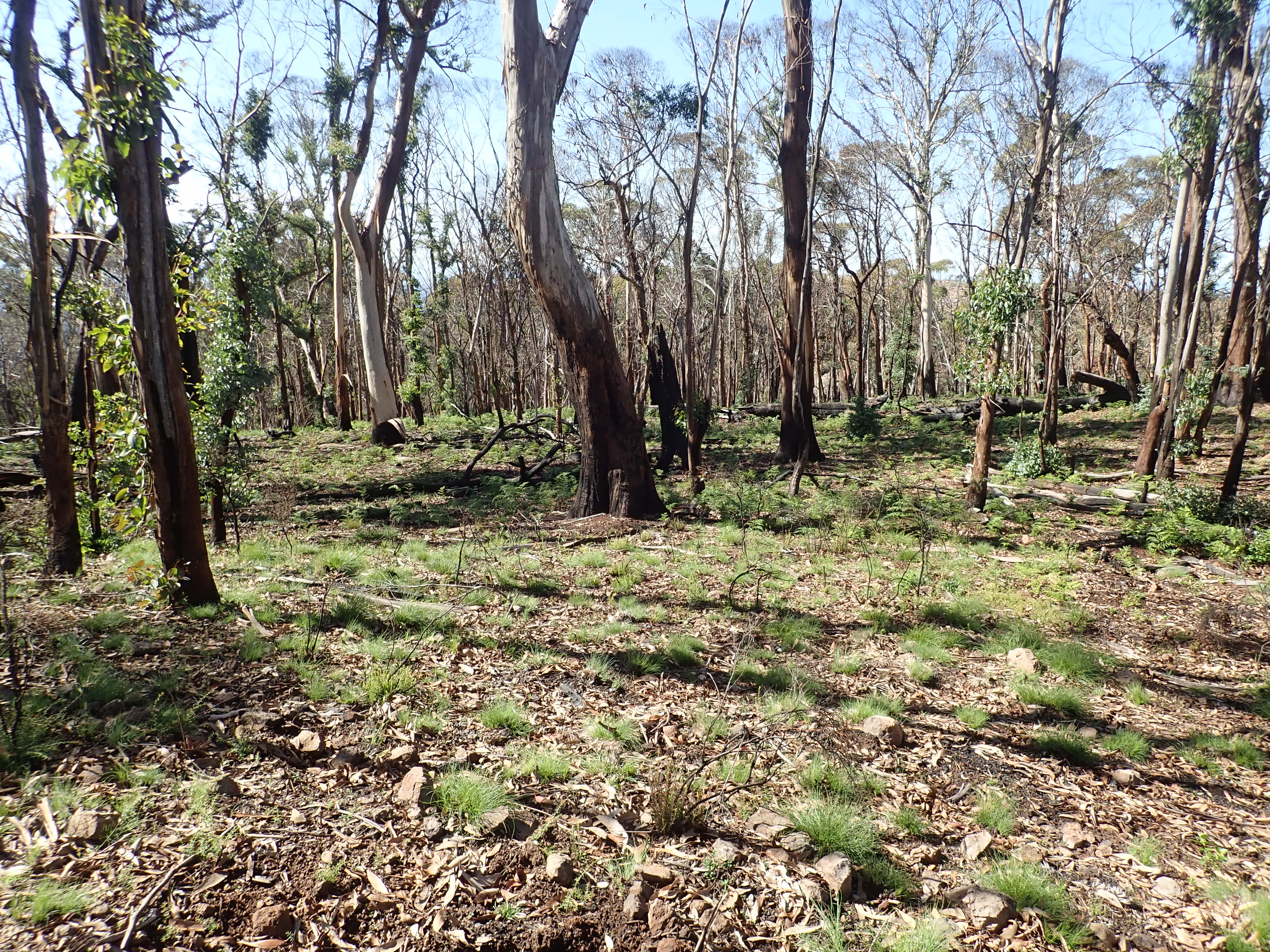
Habitat
