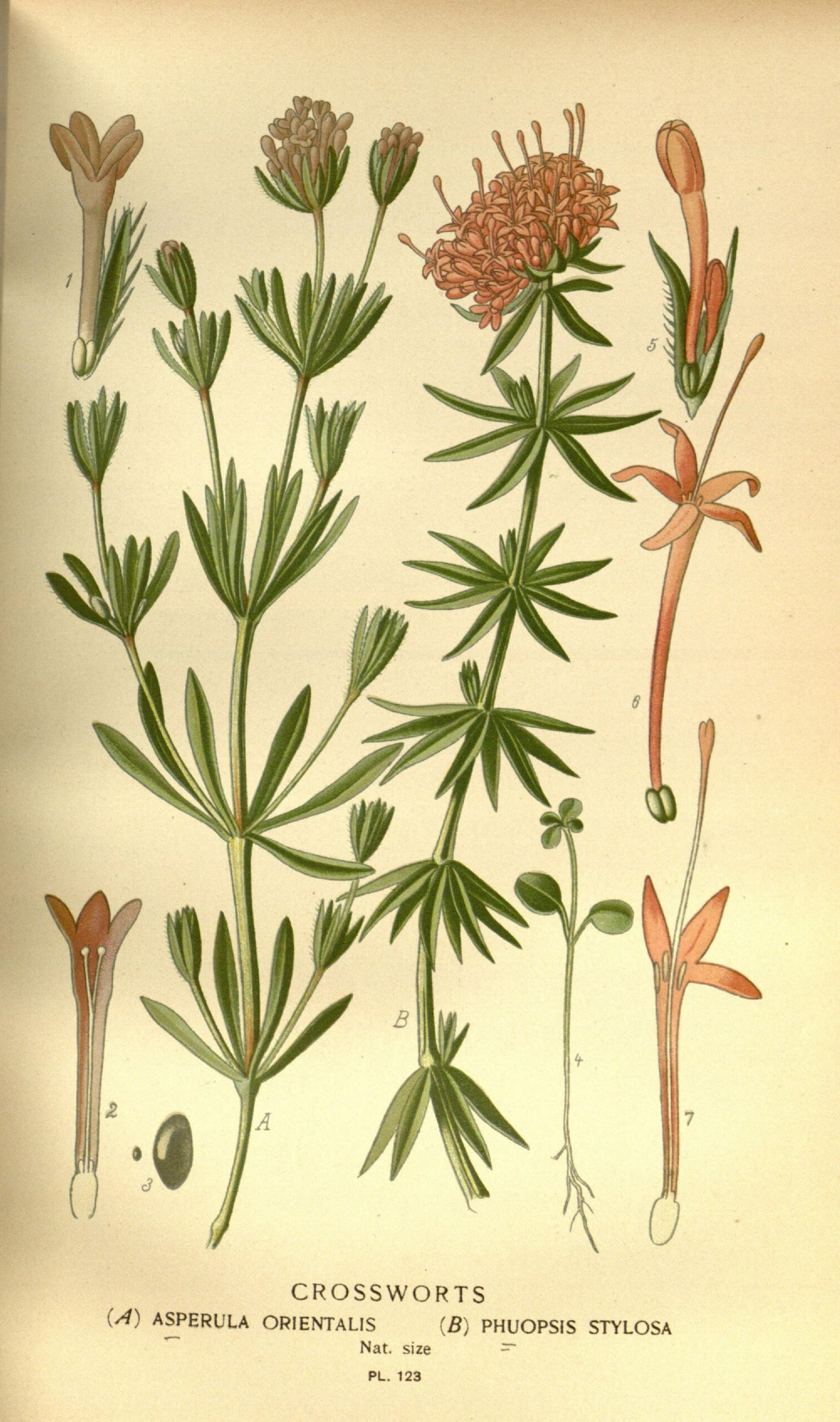

Scientific classification
- Kingdom: Plantae
- Clade: Tracheophytes
- Clade: Angiosperms
- Clade: Eudicots
- Clade: Asterids
- Order: Gentianales
- Family: Rubiaceae
- Genus: Asperula
- Species: A. orientalis

Binomial name
- Asperula orientalis Boiss. & Hohen.

Synonyms
- Asperula azurea Jaub. & Spach; Asperula azurea var. setosa Regel; Galium azureum (Jaub. & Spach) E.H.L.Krause

= Asperula orientalis =

Oriental woodruff

Species of plant in the coffee family

Asperula orientalis, known as annual woodruff or oriental woodruff, is a species of flowering plant in the family Rubiaceae. It is found in Turkey, Lebanon, western Syria, Iraq, the Caucasus and Iran. It is often used as an ornamental plant in various regions and is reportedly naturalized in Oregon, North Dakota and the Czech Republic.
