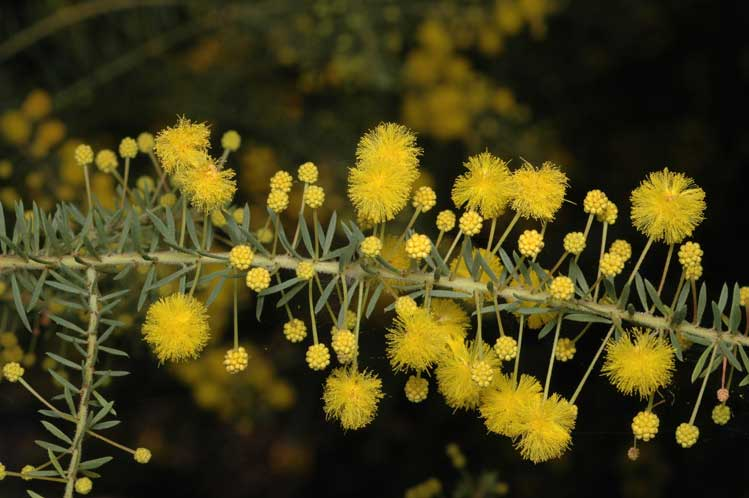
- Acacia conferta in Mount Annan Botanic Garden

Scientific classification
- Kingdom: Plantae
- Clade: Tracheophytes
- Clade: Angiosperms
- Clade: Eudicots
- Clade: Rosids
- Order: Fabales
- Family: Fabaceae
- Subfamily: Caesalpinioideae
- Clade: Mimosoid clade
- Genus: Acacia
- Species: A. conferta

Binomial name
- Acacia conferta A.Cunn. ex Benth.
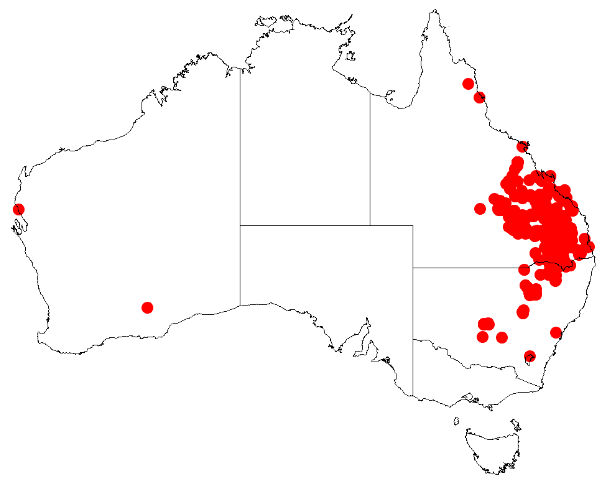
- Occurrence data from AVH

Synonyms
- Acacia conferta A.Cunn. ex Benth.; Acacia tindaleae Pedley; Racosperma confertum (A.Cunn. ex Benth.) Pedley; Racosperma tindaleae (Pedley) Pedley

= Acacia conferta =

Crowded-leaf wattle

Species of legume

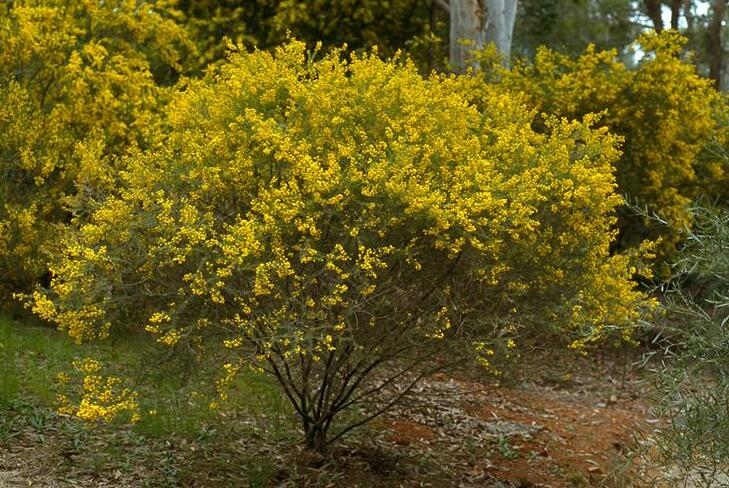
Habit in the Australian National Botanic Gardens

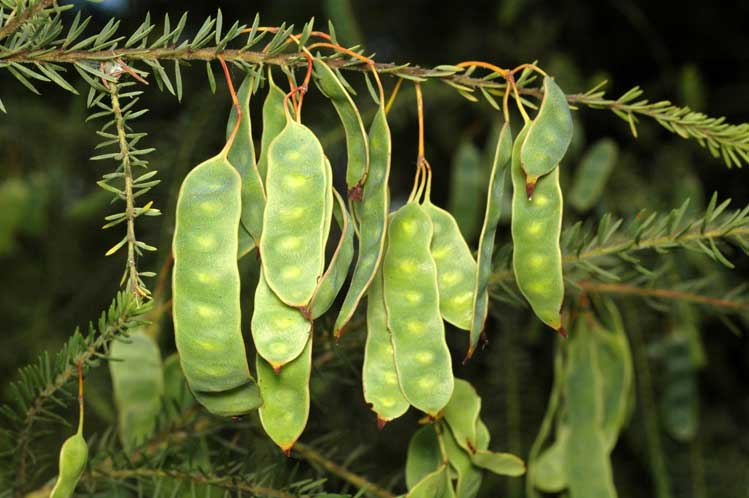
Pods

Acacia conferta, commonly known as crowded-leaf wattle or crowded-leaved wattle, is a species of flowering plant in the family Fabaceae and is endemic to eastern Australia. It is a shrub or tree with slender, hairy branchlets, crowded linear to narrowly oblong, flat phyllodes, spherical heads of bright yellow flowers and firmly papery, glabrous, pods.

== Description ==
Acacia conferta is a rounded shrub or tree typically grows to a height of up to 4 m (13 ft), and has slender branchlets with more or less spreading, crisped or curved hairs. The phyllodes are crowded on short stem-projections, flat, linear to narrowly oblong, 5–12 mm (0.20–0.47 in) long and 1–2 mm (0.039–0.079 in) wide with a small gland up to 2 mm (0.079 in) above the base of the phyllodes. The flowers are borne in a single spherical head in axils, on a peduncle 8–20 mm (0.31–0.79 in) long, each head usually with 20 to 25 bright yellow flowers. Flowering mainly occurs from April to August, and the pods are firmly papery, usually up to 60 mm (2.4 in) long, 10–15 mm (0.39–0.59 in) wide, glabrous and covered with a white, powdery bloom.

== Taxonomy ==
Acacia conferta was first formally described in 1842 by George Bentham from an unpublished description by Allan Cunningham in Hooker's London Journal of Botany. The specific epithet (conferta) means 'pressed close together', alluding to the often crowded phyllodes.

== Distribution and habitat ==
Crowded-leaf wattle occurs on the western slopes and plains of New South Wales, north from Moree and Warialda, extending north into south-eastern Queensland as far west as Blackall and east to the coast around Proserpine, with one collection near Cairns. It grows in sandy or loamy soils in dry sclerophyll forest or Eucalyptus woodland.

== Use in horticulture ==
This species of wattle is sometimes cultivated and can be propagated by scarifying the seeds or treatment with boiling water. It prefers a sunny position and will grow in most soil types in a well-drained position. It is also frost tolerant and can cope to temperatures as low as −7 °C (19 °F).

== See also ==
- List of Acacia species
