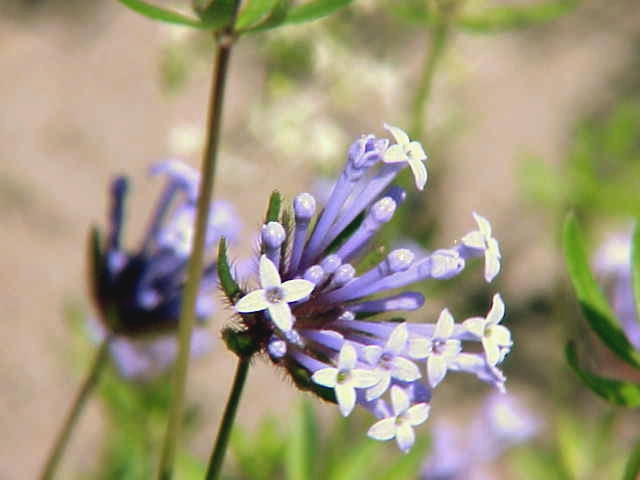
- Asperula arvensis - Blue woodruff

Scientific classification
- Kingdom: Plantae
- Clade: Tracheophytes
- Clade: Angiosperms
- Clade: Eudicots
- Clade: Asterids
- Order: Gentianales
- Family: Rubiaceae
- Subfamily: Rubioideae
- Tribe: Rubieae
- Genus: Asperula; L.

Synonyms
- List: Asterophyllum K.F.Schimp. & Spenn.; Blepharostemma Fourr.; Chrozorrhiza Ehrh.; Galiopsis St.-Lag.; Lepunis Steven

= Asperula =

Genus of flowering plants in the coffee family

Asperula, commonly known as woodruff, is a genus of flowering plants in the family Rubiaceae. It contains 91 species and has a wide distribution area from Europe, northern Africa, temperate and subtropical Asia to Australasia.

== Species ==
These species are recognised in the genus Asperula:

- Asperula acuminata I.Thomps.
- Asperula albiflora Popov
- Asperula ambleia Airy Shaw
- Asperula anatolica M.Öztürk
- Asperula apuana (Fiori) Arrigoni
- Asperula arvensis L. - blue woodruff
- Asperula assamica Meisn.
- Asperula asterocephala Bornm.
- Asperula asthenes Airy Shaw & Turrill - trailing woodruff
- Asperula azerbaidjanica Mam, Shach & Velib.
- Asperula badachschenica Pachom.
- Asperula balchanica Bobrov
- Asperula bargyli Gomb.
- Asperula botschantzevii Pachom.
- Asperula brachyantha Boiss.
- Asperula cankiriensis B.Şahin & Sağıroğlu
- Asperula charophyton Airy Shaw & Turrill - strapleaf woodruff
- Asperula ciliatula Pachom.
- Asperula cilicia Hausskn. ex Ehrend.
- Asperula comosa Schönb.-Tem.
- Asperula conferta Hook.f. - common woodruff
- Asperula congesta Tschern.
- Asperula crassula Greuter & Zaffran
- Asperula cunninghamii Airy Shaw & Turrill - twining woodruff
- Asperula cymulosa (Post) Post
- Asperula czukavinae Pachom. & Karim
- Asperula dasyantha Klokov
- Asperula euryphylla Airy Shaw & Turrill
- Asperula fedtschenkoi Ovcz. & Tschernov
- Asperula fidanii Eroğlu
- Asperula fragillima Boiss. & Hausskn.
- Asperula friabilis Schönb.-Tem.
- Asperula galioides M.Bieb.
- Asperula gemella Airy Shaw & Turrill - twin-leaved bedstraw
- Asperula geminifolia F.Muell.
- Asperula glabrata Tschern.
- Asperula glomerata (M.Bieb.) Griseb.
- Asperula gobica Govaerts
- Asperula gobicola Grubov
- Asperula gracilis C.A.Mey.
- Asperula gunnii Hook.f. - mountain woodruff
- Asperula hoskingii I.Thomps.
- Asperula insignis (Vatke) Ehrend.
- Asperula insolita Pachom.
- Asperula involucrata Wahlenb.
- Asperula karategini Pachom. & Karim
- Asperula kotschyana (Boiss. & Hohen.) Boiss.
- Asperula kovalevskiana Pachom.
- Asperula kryloviana Sergeev
- Asperula laevigata L.
- Asperula lasiantha Nakai - Korean woodruff
- Asperula libanotica Boiss.
- Asperula majoriflora Borbás ex Formánek
- Asperula minima Hook.f.
- Asperula molluginoides (M.Bieb.) Rchb.
- Asperula nuratensis Pachom.
- Asperula oblanceolata I.Thomps.
- Asperula oppositifolia Regel & Schmalh.
- Asperula orientalis Boiss. & Hohen. - blue woodruff
- Asperula pauciflora Tschern.
- Asperula perpusilla Hook.f.
- Asperula podlechii Schönb.-Tem.
- Asperula polymera I.Thomps.
- Asperula popovii Schischk.
- Asperula × portae Peruzzi
- Asperula prostrata (Adams) K.Koch
- Asperula pugionifolia Tschern.
- Asperula pulchella (Podlech) Ehrend. & Schönb.-Tem.
- Asperula pusilla Hook.f. - alpine woodruff
- Asperula rechingeri Ehrend. & Schönb.-Tem.
- Asperula rezaiyensis Schönb.-Tem.
- Asperula scabrella Tschern.
- Asperula scoparia Hook.f. - prickly woodruff
- Asperula seticornis Boiss.
- Asperula setosa Jaub. & Spach
- Asperula sherardioides Jaub. & Spach
- Asperula sordide-rosea Popov
- Asperula strishovae Pachom. & Karim
- Asperula suavis Fisch., C.A.Mey. & Avé-Lall.
- Asperula subsimplex Hook.f.
- Asperula subulifolia Airy Shaw & Turrill
- Asperula syrticola (Miq.) Airy Shaw & Turrill
- Asperula szovitsii Ehrend. & Schönb.-Tem.
- Asperula taurina L. - pink woodruff
- Asperula taygetea Boiss. & Heldr.
- Asperula tenuissima K.Koch
- Asperula tetraphylla (Airy Shaw & Turrill) I.Thomps.
- Asperula tinctoria L. - Dyer's woodruff
- Asperula trichodes J.Gay ex DC.
- Asperula trifida Makino
- Asperula tschernevae Kamelin
- Asperula tymphaea T.Gregor, Meierott & Raus
- Asperula virgata Hub.-Mor. ex Ehrend. & Schönb.-Tem. – rod-shaped woodruff
- Asperula wimmeriana Airy Shaw & Turrill
- Asperula xylorrhiza Nábelek
