= Aegialia conferta =

Scientific classification
- Domain: Eukaryota
- Kingdom: Animalia
- Phylum: Arthropoda
- Class: Insecta
- Order: Coleoptera
- Suborder: Polyphaga
- Infraorder: Scarabaeiformia
- Family: Scarabaeidae
- Genus: Aegialia
- Species: A. conferta

Binomial name
- Aegialia conferta Horn, 1871

Species of beetle

Aegialia conferta is a species of aphodiine dung beetle in the family Scarabaeidae. It is found in North America.

== Subspecies ==
These two subspecies belong to the species Aegialia conferta:

- Aegialia conferta conferta^{g}
- Aegialia conferta nigrella Brown, 1931^{c g}

Data sources: i = ITIS, c = Catalogue of Life, g = GBIF, b = Bugguide.net
