= Eva Schönbeck-Temesy =

Austrian botanist (1930–2011)

Eva Schönbeck-Temesy (August 16, 1930 – August 27, 2011) was an Austrian botanist of Hungarian descent who made notable contributions to Karl Heinz Rechinger's magisterial Flora Iranica.

== Life and career ==
The fourth daughter of General Stefan Temesy and Ludovika Temesy née Messek, she was born in Győr, the most important city in northwestern Hungary. She attended elementary school and afterwards (1940–44) Szent Margit Leánygimnázium (St. Margaret's School for Girls) in Székesfehérvár in central Hungary. In the turmoil of the invasion of Hungary by the Red Army, the Temesy family left the country and settled in the Styrian capital Graz in eastern Austria, where the young Eva resumed her secondary education at BRG II for Girls in 1946 - from which she graduated with distinction in 1949. In the same year, she enrolled at the University of Graz to study botany. Her doctoral thesis, entitled The Polytypic Species Saxifraga stellaris Linné, which she wrote under the guidance of Professor Felix Joseph Widder, earned her in 1954 the degree of Ph.D. Sub auspiciis Praesidentis - the highest honour which may be bestowed by the Austrian University system.

On July 9, 1956 she married the zoologist Horst Schönbeck (1929–2009) by whom she had three children: Susanne (1957-), Stefan (1959-) and Pippa (1961-). Up until 1964, the young Schönbeck-Temesy family lived in the municipality of Judendorf-Straßengel, in the district of Graz-Umgebung. There then followed a work-related move to Vienna.

From January 1, 1965 to December 1, 1970 Schönbeck-Temesy worked on a research fellowship and then up until March 30, 1973 on an Arbeitsauftrag in the botany department of the Natural History Museum, Vienna under the Directorship of Professor Karl Heinz Rechinger. On March 1, 1974 she became Keeper of the museum's Herbarium - a post in which she remained until her retirement in April 1993. Schönbeck-Temesy benefitted greatly, during her academic career, from her polyglotism : in addition to her mother tongues of Hungarian and German she was also fluent in English, French, Italian, and Russian. A true Grande Dame of the world of botany, she is commemorated in the name of the rubiaceous plant Galium schoenbeck-temesyae Ehrend. Dr. Schönbeck-Temesy's eldest daughter, Dr. Susanne Grass-Schönbeck, is maintaining the family tradition of scientific excellence, albeit in the unrelated field of pulmonology.

== Publications and verifications ==
Schönbeck-Temesy authored several volumes of the Flora Iranica and verified a number of plant species.

Of the Flora Iranica she authored volume 19 and 20 on the Hydrangeaceae and Parnassiaceae, volumes 23 to 33 on the Acanthaceae, Aquifoliaceae, Aristolochiaceae, Buxaceae, Ceratophyllaceae, Datiscaceae, Ebenaceae, Hippuridaceae, Myrtaceae and Nymphaeaceae. Subsequently she authored volume 42 on the Saxifragaceae, volume 47 on the Grossulariaceae, volume 69 on the Geraniaceae and volume 100 on the Solanaceae.

The standard author abbreviation Schönb.-Tem. is used to indicate this person as the author when citing a botanical name. In the course of her botany work she identified, classified and verified plants. Several plant species have also been named after her.
