= William Bertram Turrill =

English botanist (1890–1961)

- Born: 14 June 1890; Woodstock, Oxfordshire
- Died: 15 December 1961 (aged 71); Surrey
- Education: Chelsea Polytechnic
- Spouse: Florence Homan
- Awards: Linnean Medal (1958); Fellow of the Royal Society; Order of the British Empire
- Scientific career
- Workplaces: Royal Botanic Gardens, Kew
- Author abbrev. (botany)

William Bertram Turrill FRS OBE FLS (14 June 1890 – 15 December 1961) was an English botanist.

W B Turrill's mathematical classification of leaf shapes

== Education ==
He was born in Woodstock, Oxfordshire to William Banbury and Thirza Mary (née Homan) Turrill and educated at the Woodstock National School.

He served with the Royal Army Medical Corps of the British Army during the First World War, mainly on the Macedonian front.

== Career ==
Turrill worked in the Royal Botanic Gardens at Kew and was responsible for many innovations including a mathematical classification of leaf shapes.

== Awards and honours ==
Turrill received the Order of the British Empire in 1955 and the gold medal of the Linnean Society in 1958. He was elected a Fellow of the Royal Society in March 1958 as someone:

Distinguished for his work on plant taxonomy, particularly for his experimental and genetical approach to problems among British plant species and for his exceptional knowledge of the floras of the Near East.

This botanist is denoted by the author abbreviation Turrill when citing a botanical name.

== Personal life ==
He married Florence Homan in 1918.

He spent his Childhood, searching the woods, fields, broad green lanes, ponds and watercourses.

The plant species Veronica turrilliana, Symplocos turrilliana, Cryptocarya turrilliana, Astragalus turrillii and Cyperus turrillii are named after him.
