= Acrossus igai =

Scientific classification
- Kingdom: Animalia
- Phylum: Arthropoda
- Clade: Pancrustacea
- Class: Insecta
- Order: Coleoptera
- Suborder: Polyphaga
- Infraorder: Scarabaeiformia
- Family: Scarabaeidae
- Genus: Acrossus
- Species: A. igai

Binomial name
- Acrossus igai (Nakane, 1956)

Synonyms
- Aphodius (Acrossus) japonicus igai Nakane, 1956; Aphodius (Acrossus) igai pseudoigai Nakane & Masumoto, 1967; Aphodius (Acrossus) igai sakuraii Nakane & Masumoto, 1967; Aphodius (Acrossus) igai tsurugianus Nakane & Masumoto, 1967; Aphodius (Acrossus) japonicus miyakei Nakane, 1960

Species of beetle

Acrossus igai is a species of beetle of the family Scarabaeidae. It is found in Japan.

== Description ==
Adults reach a length of about 6.5–7.5 mm (0.26–0.30 in). They are similar to Acrossus japonicus, but the rows of punctures are distinct right up to the apex and the elytra have a fairly clear microsculpture, making them less shiny.
