= Acrossus gagatinus =

Scientific classification
- Kingdom: Animalia
- Phylum: Arthropoda
- Clade: Pancrustacea
- Class: Insecta
- Order: Coleoptera
- Suborder: Polyphaga
- Infraorder: Scarabaeiformia
- Family: Scarabaeidae
- Genus: Acrossus
- Species: A. gagatinus

Binomial name
- Acrossus gagatinus (Ménétriés, 1832)

Synonyms
- Aphodius gagatinus Ménétriés, 1832

Species of beetle

Acrossus gagatinus is a species of beetle of the family Scarabaeidae. It is found in Armenia, Georgia, Iran, Russia and Turkmenistan.

== Description ==
Adults reach a length of about 13–15 mm (0.51–0.59 in). They have a black body. They are very similar to Acrossus rufipes, but the head is more strongly and densely punctate and the punctation of the pronotum is stronger.
