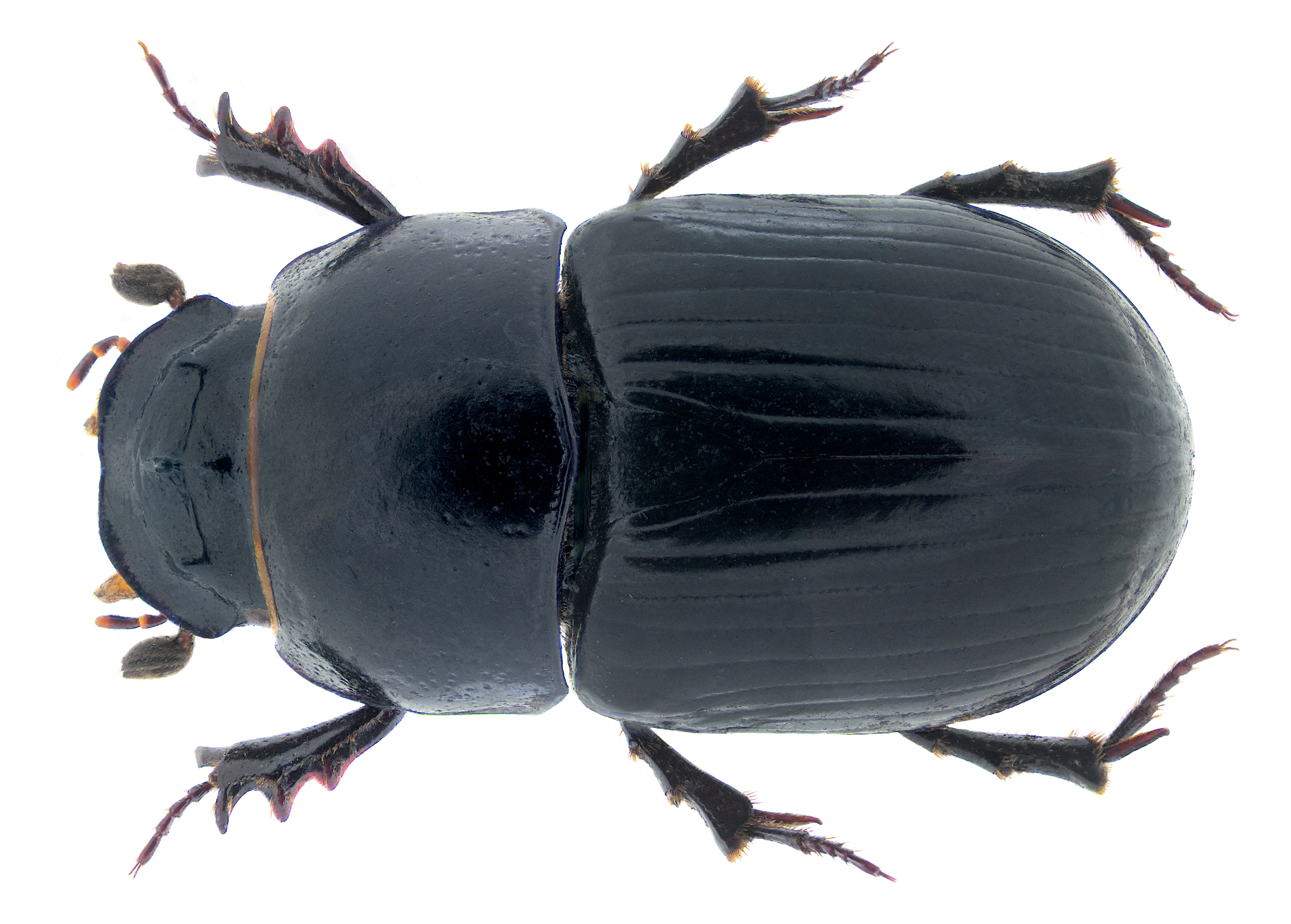
- Teuchestes fossor, Italy

Conservation status
- Unranked (NatureServe)

Scientific classification
- Kingdom: Animalia
- Phylum: Arthropoda
- Clade: Pancrustacea
- Class: Insecta
- Order: Coleoptera
- Suborder: Polyphaga
- Infraorder: Scarabaeiformia
- Family: Scarabaeidae
- Genus: Teuchestes
- Species: T. fossor

Binomial name
- Teuchestes fossor (Linnaeus, 1758)

Synonyms
- Scarabaeus fossor Linnaeus, 1758; Aphodius fossor (Linnaeus, 1758); Aphodius fossor femoralis Sahlberg, 1900; Aphodius fossorius Gistel, 1857; Teuchestes fossor brunneus Mulsant, 1842; Aphodius silvaticus Ahrens, 1812; Scarabaeus triangulum Piller & Mitterpache, 1783

= Teuchestes fossor =

Species of beetle

Teuchestes fossor, the gravedigger dung beetle, is a species of dung beetle native to the Palaearctic, but is also widespread in North America following accidental introduction and naturalisation during European settlement. Both adults and larvae are coprophagous, differentiating resource use by respectively feeding on the liquid and fibrous fractions of herbivore dung. It can be readily collected from the dung of livestock, and other large mammals This species is known to support a number of key ecosystem services in cattle pastures.

Teuchestes fossor was formerly a member of the genus Aphodius.

== Appearance ==
=== Adult ===
Teuchestes fossor is a highly convex beetle measuring between 8–12 millimetres (0.31–0.47 in) in length, and 2–3 millimetres (0.079–0.118 in) in breadth. The scutellum is long, and reaches more than 20% sutural length. The elytral striae are relatively narrow. The pronotum is densely punctured towards side and front angles. Its typical colour is a uniform glossy black, although it can also rarely occurs in a dark red form where it may superficially resemble Acrossus rufipes. Males are differentiated from females by a small but prominent horn on the head.

=== Larvae ===
Larvae are typical C-shaped scarabaeid larvae, and undergo three larval instars before pupation.

== Ecology ==
Like other species within the genus, this dung beetle is classified as a 'dwelling' or 'endocoprid' species, where in place of rolling dung balls—beetles feed and reproduces within the confines of mammalian dung. Adult beetles preferentially colonise older cattle dung, moving between several dung pats as adults. Eggs are laid singly beneath the dung crust and in the underlying soil. Adult beetles typically occur at low densities in mated pairs, and mate-finding and anti-aggregation are thought to be mediated by pheromones. Despite being found in open environments like pastures, Acrossus fossor is sensitive to desiccation and larvae experience significant mortality when highly exposed environments.

== Sensitivity to veterinary anthelmintics ==
A number of studies have shown that coprophagous insects suffer a suite of lethal and sublethal effects in response to veterinary anthelmintic residues. Adult beetles show negligible sensitivity to the anthelmintic ivermectin, but in contrast larvae are highly sensitive.

== Role as a beneficial insect ==
The feeding of larvae and adults enhances the rate at which dung disappears from the pasture surface. This action allows for the growth of new forage, while also acting to release nutrients back into the soil, and helps relieve surface soil compaction. As adults and larvae often feed at the soil-dung interface, soil particles may be inadvertently introduced into the dung and the contributions of Acrossus fossor to dung removal may be underestimated.
