= Acrossus longepilosus =

Scientific classification
- Kingdom: Animalia
- Phylum: Arthropoda
- Clade: Pancrustacea
- Class: Insecta
- Order: Coleoptera
- Suborder: Polyphaga
- Infraorder: Scarabaeiformia
- Family: Scarabaeidae
- Genus: Acrossus
- Species: A. longepilosus

Binomial name
- Acrossus longepilosus (Schmidt, 1910)

Synonyms
- Aphodius longepilosus Schmidt, 1910

Species of beetle

Acrossus longepilosus is a species of beetle of the family Scarabaeidae. It is found in Angola, Ethiopia and Kenya.

== Description ==
Adults reach a length of about 9 mm (0.35 in). They have a broad, flatly convex, shiny, almost unpunctured body. The upper and lower surfaces are uniformly yellowish light brown, with the back of the head and sides of the metasternum blackish, the pronotum with a dark spot on each side and the elytra somewhat dark reddish-brown at the lateral margin before the apex.
