= Acrossus laticollis =

Scientific classification
- Kingdom: Animalia
- Phylum: Arthropoda
- Clade: Pancrustacea
- Class: Insecta
- Order: Coleoptera
- Suborder: Polyphaga
- Infraorder: Scarabaeiformia
- Family: Scarabaeidae
- Genus: Acrossus
- Species: A. laticollis

Binomial name
- Acrossus laticollis (Baudi, 1870)

Synonyms
- Aphodius laticollis Baudi, 1870

Species of beetle

Acrossus laticollis is a species of beetle of the family Scarabaeidae. It is found in France and Italy.

== Description ==
Adults reach a length of about 10–13 mm (0.39–0.51 in). They are black-brown or black and moderately shiny. The underside and legs are reddish-brown, and the antennal club is yellowish-brown.
