= Acrossus luridus =

Scientific classification
- Kingdom: Animalia
- Phylum: Arthropoda
- Clade: Pancrustacea
- Class: Insecta
- Order: Coleoptera
- Suborder: Polyphaga
- Infraorder: Scarabaeiformia
- Family: Scarabaeidae
- Genus: Acrossus
- Species: A. luridus

Binomial name
- Acrossus luridus (Fabricius, 1775)

Synonyms
- Scarabaeus luridus Fabricius, 1775; Acrossus luridus unicoloratus Dellacasa & Dellacasa, 2005; Acrossus pellidus Schmidt, 1917; Aphodius luridus lividibasis Reitter, 1898; Aphodius (Acrossus) luridus faillae Ragusa, 1892; Aphodius luridus hilleri Schilsky, 1888; Aphodius (Acrossus) luridus humeralis Dalla Torre, 1879; Aphodius (Acrossus) luridus rufonotatus Dalla Torre, 1879; Aphodius (Acrossus) luridus strigosus Dalla Torre, 1879; Aphodius aterunicolor Hochhuth, 1873; Aphodius faecis Gistel, 1857; Acrossus luridus apicalis Mulsant, 1842; Acrossus luridus bipaginatus Mulsant, 1842; Acrossus luridus connexus Mulsant, 1842; Acrossus luridus informis Mulsant, 1842; Acrossus luridus intricarius Mulsant, 1842; Acrossus luridus lateralis Mulsant, 1842; Aphodius sutorius Faldermann, 1833; Aphodius deplanatus Ménétriés, 1832; Aphodius rufitarsis Latreille, 1807; Scarabaeus nigrosulcatus Marsham, 1802; Aphodius lutarius Fabricius, 1801; Scarabaeus nigripes Fabricius, 1792; Scarabaeus varius Linnaeus, 1788; Scarabaeus gagatinus Fourcroy, 1785; Scarabaeus arator Herbst, 1783; Scarabaeus interpunctatus Herbst, 1783; Scarabaeus variegatus Herbst, 1783; Scarabaeus gagates Müller, 1776

Species of beetle

Acrossus luridus is a species of beetle of the family Scarabaeidae.

== Description ==
Adults reach a length of about 6–12 mm (0.24–0.47 in). They have an elongate-oval, slightly convex, weakly shiny, glabrous, blackish body, with yellowish elytra with blackish spots. The elytra have a few hairs apically.

== Distribution ==
Palaearctic: Afghanistan, Albania, Armenia, Austria, Azerbaijan, Belarus, Belgium, Bosnia and Herzegovina, Bulgaria, China (Xinjiang), Croatia, Cyprus, Czech Republic, Denmark, Estonia, Finland, France, Georgia, Germany, Great Britain, Greece, Hungary, Iran, Ireland, Israel, Italy, Kazakhstan, Kyrgyzstan, Latvia, Lithuania, Macedonia, Montenegro, Morocco, Netherlands, Norway, Poland, Portugal, Romania, Russia, Saudi Arabia, Serbia, Siberia, Slovakia, Slovenia, Spain, Sweden, Switzerland, Syria, Tajikistan, Tunisia, Turkey, Turkmenistan, Ukraine). Nearctic: introduced to North America. Neotropical: introduced to the Antilles.
