= Acrossus humerospinosus =

Scientific classification
- Kingdom: Animalia
- Phylum: Arthropoda
- Clade: Pancrustacea
- Class: Insecta
- Order: Coleoptera
- Suborder: Polyphaga
- Infraorder: Scarabaeiformia
- Family: Scarabaeidae
- Genus: Acrossus
- Species: A. humerospinosus

Binomial name
- Acrossus humerospinosus (Petrovitz, 1958)

Synonyms
- Aphodius (Acrossus) humerospinosus Petrovitz, 1958

Species of beetle

Acrossus humerospinosus is a species of beetle of the family Scarabaeidae. It is found in China (Sichuan, Yunnan).

== Description ==
Adults reach a length of about 8 mm (0.31 in). They have an almost cylindrical, black, somewhat glossy body.
