= Acrossus jedlickai =

Scientific classification
- Kingdom: Animalia
- Phylum: Arthropoda
- Clade: Pancrustacea
- Class: Insecta
- Order: Coleoptera
- Suborder: Polyphaga
- Infraorder: Scarabaeiformia
- Family: Scarabaeidae
- Genus: Acrossus
- Species: A. jedlickai

Binomial name
- Acrossus jedlickai (Balthasar, 1932)

Synonyms
- Aphodius (Acrossus) jedlickai Balthasar, 1932

Species of beetle

Acrossus jedlickai is a species of beetle of the family Scarabaeidae. It is found in China (Sichuan).

== Description ==
Adults reach a length of about 7.5–8.5 mm (0.30–0.33 in). They have a black or blackish-brown body, with the tips of the elytra often translucent. They are glabrous, with the head and pronotum quite shiny, while the most of the elytra are dull.
