= Teuchestes brachysomus =

Scientific classification
- Kingdom: Animalia
- Phylum: Arthropoda
- Clade: Pancrustacea
- Class: Insecta
- Order: Coleoptera
- Suborder: Polyphaga
- Infraorder: Scarabaeiformia
- Family: Scarabaeidae
- Genus: Teuchestes
- Species: T. brachysomus

Binomial name
- Teuchestes brachysomus (Solsky, 1874)

Synonyms
- Aphodius (Otophorus) brachysomus Solsky, 1874; Aphodius (Otophorus) brachysomus flavelytrus Kim, 1985; Aphodius (Teuchestes) brachysomus bimaculatus Dellacasa, 1983; Aphodius (Teuchestes) brachysomus latebimaculatus Dellacasa, 1983; Aphodius (Teuchestes) brachysomus quadrimaculatus Dellacasa, 1983; Aphodius (Teuchestes) brachysomus quadrisubmaculatus Dellacasa, 1983; Aphodius (Teuchestes) brachysomus trimaculatus Dellacasa, 1983; Aphodius (Teuchestes) brachysomus unimaculatus Dellacasa, 1983; Aphodius (Teuchestes) brachysomus quinquemaculatus Schmidt, 1914; Aphodius major Waterhouse, 1875

Species of beetle

Teuchestes brachysomus is a species of beetle of the family Scarabaeidae. It is found in China (Fujian, Heilongjiang, Jilin, Zhejiang), Japan, Korea, the Russia Far East, Siberia, India and Indochina.

== Description ==
Adults reach a length of about 7–11 mm (0.28–0.43 in). They have an almost hemispherical-oval, shiny, black body. Many specimens have a yellow to brownish-yellow pattern on the elytra.

== Life history ==
Specimens have been collected in cow, human, horse and sheep dung.
