= Acrossus ritsemai =

Scientific classification
- Kingdom: Animalia
- Phylum: Arthropoda
- Clade: Pancrustacea
- Class: Insecta
- Order: Coleoptera
- Suborder: Polyphaga
- Infraorder: Scarabaeiformia
- Family: Scarabaeidae
- Genus: Acrossus
- Species: A. ritsemai

Binomial name
- Acrossus ritsemai (Schmidt, 1909)

Synonyms
- Aphodius (Acrossus) ritsemai Schmidt, 1909

Species of beetle

Acrossus ritsemai is a species of beetle of the family Scarabaeidae. It is found in China (Xizang), India (Himachal Pradesh, Sikkim) and Nepal.

== Description ==
Adults reach a length of about 11 mm (0.43 in). They have a long, slender, dark brown to black, glossy body.
