= Acrossus delavayi =

Scientific classification
- Kingdom: Animalia
- Phylum: Arthropoda
- Clade: Pancrustacea
- Class: Insecta
- Order: Coleoptera
- Suborder: Polyphaga
- Infraorder: Scarabaeiformia
- Family: Scarabaeidae
- Genus: Acrossus
- Species: A. delavayi

Binomial name
- Acrossus delavayi (Koshantschikov, 1916)

Synonyms
- Aphodius (Acrossidius) delavayi Koshantschikov, 1916

Species of beetle

Acrossus delavayi is a species of beetle of the family Scarabaeidae. It is found in China (Yunnan).

== Description ==
Adults reach a length of about 11.5 mm (0.45 in). They have a slightly convex, glossy, dark brown body. The elytra have reddish-brown tips.
