= Acrossus unifasciatus =

Scientific classification
- Kingdom: Animalia
- Phylum: Arthropoda
- Clade: Pancrustacea
- Class: Insecta
- Order: Coleoptera
- Suborder: Polyphaga
- Infraorder: Scarabaeiformia
- Family: Scarabaeidae
- Genus: Acrossus
- Species: A. unifasciatus

Binomial name
- Acrossus unifasciatus (Nomura & Nakane, 1951)

Synonyms
- Aphodius (Acrossus) unifasciatus Nomura & Nakane, 1951; Aphodius (Acrossus) unifasciatus kiiensis Nakane, 1960; Aphodius (Acrossus) unifasciatus hayashii Nakane, 1955

Species of beetle

Acrossus unifasciatus is a species of beetle of the family Scarabaeidae. It is found in Japan.

== Description ==
Adults reach a length of about 5.5–6 mm (0.22–0.24 in). They have a moderately convex, rather shiny, black body. The elytra are light brown with darkened sutural and lateral margins, and a black, zigzag transverse band. The elytra have short, fine hairs at the apex and along the sides.
