= Acrossus tingitanus =

Scientific classification
- Kingdom: Animalia
- Phylum: Arthropoda
- Clade: Pancrustacea
- Class: Insecta
- Order: Coleoptera
- Suborder: Polyphaga
- Infraorder: Scarabaeiformia
- Family: Scarabaeidae
- Genus: Acrossus
- Species: A. tingitanus

Binomial name
- Acrossus tingitanus (Reitter, 1892)

Synonyms
- Aphodius (Acrossus) tingitanus Reitter, 1892

Species of beetle

Acrossus tingitanus is a species of beetle of the family Scarabaeidae. It is found in Morocco.

== Description ==
Adults reach a length of about 10.5–11.5 mm (0.41–0.45 in). They have a slightly convex, slender body, with the elytra shagreened and with a silky luster.
