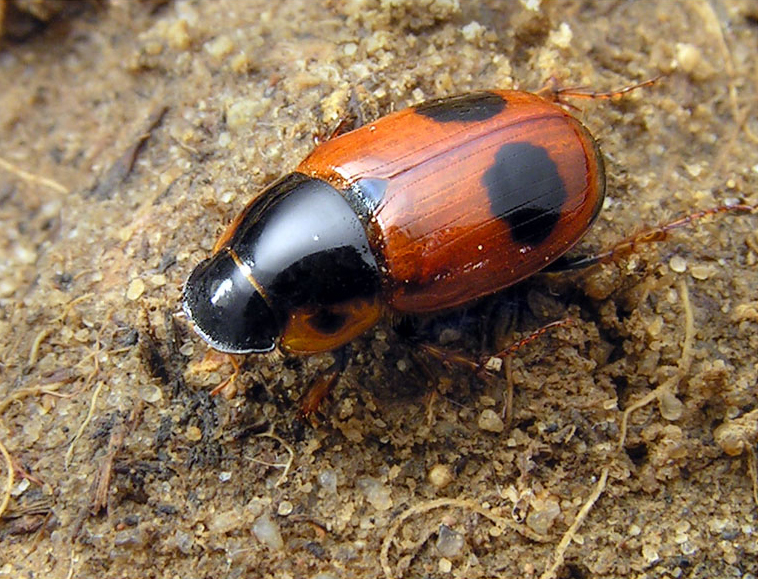
- Acrossus bimaculatus

Scientific classification
- Kingdom: Animalia
- Phylum: Arthropoda
- Clade: Pancrustacea
- Class: Insecta
- Order: Coleoptera
- Suborder: Polyphaga
- Infraorder: Scarabaeiformia
- Family: Scarabaeidae
- Tribe: Aphodiini
- Subtribe: Aphodiina
- Genus: Acrossus; Mulsant, 1842

Species
- >40 species (see text)

Synonyms
- Aphodius (Hemicyclorhinus) Seabra, 1909

= Acrossus =

Genus of beetles

Acrossus is a genus of scarab beetles in the family Scarabaeidae. There are more than 40 described species in Acrossus, found in Asia, Europe, Africa, and the Americas.

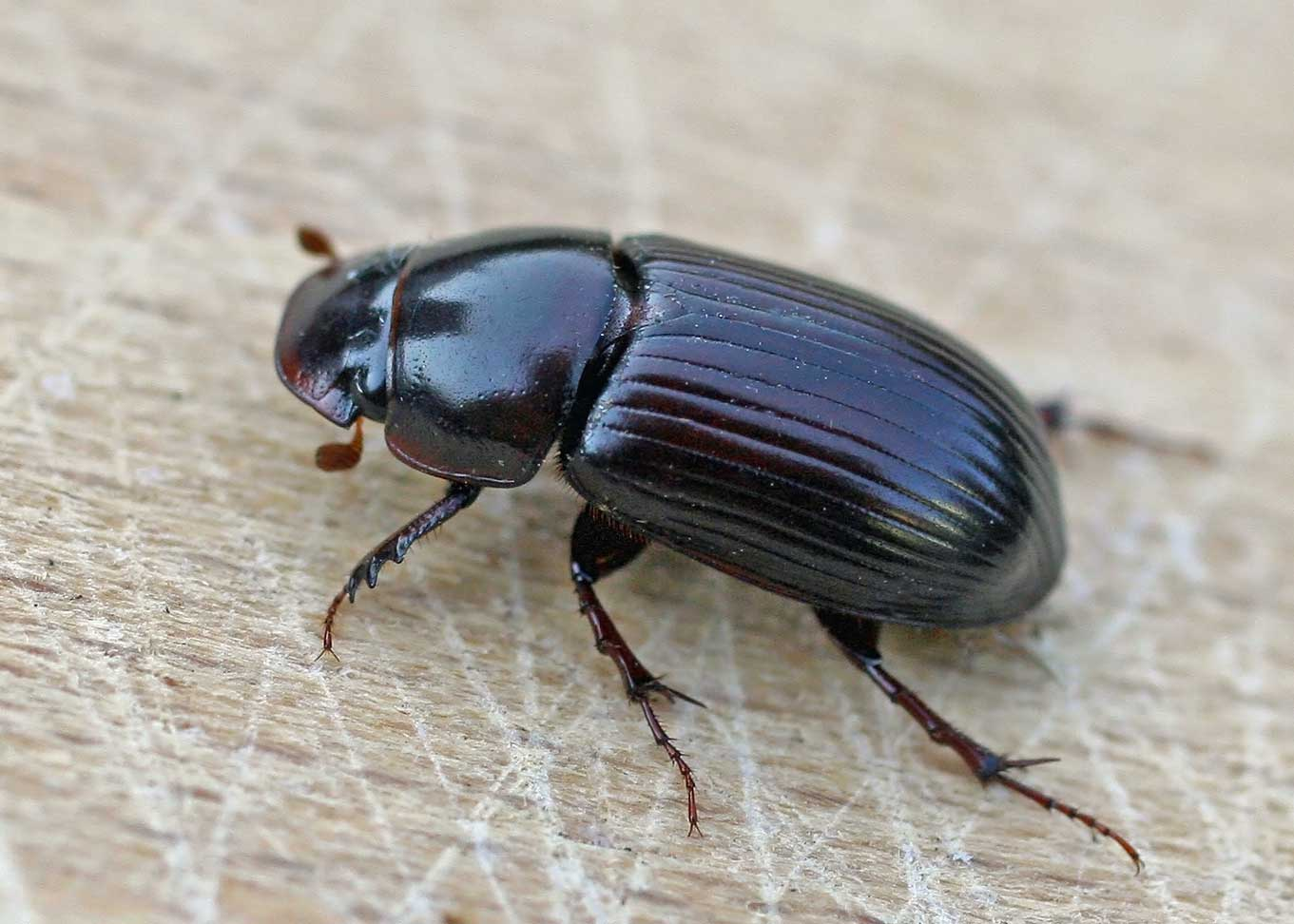
Acrossus rufipes

== Species ==
These 43 species belong to the genus Acrossus:

- Acrossus angustiarum (Balthasar, 1967)
- Acrossus atratus (Waterhouse, 1875)
- Acrossus belousovi (Frolov, 2001)
- Acrossus bimaculatus (Laxmann, 1770)
- Acrossus binaevulus (Heyden, 1887)
- Acrossus bolognai (Carpaneto & Piattella, 1989)
- Acrossus byki Minkina, 2018
- Acrossus carpetanus (Graëlls, 1847)
- Acrossus delavayi (Koshantschikov, 1916)
- Acrossus depressus (Kugelann, 1792)
- Acrossus devabhumi (Mittal, 1993)
- Acrossus eberti (Balthasar, 1965)
- Acrossus emodus (Petrovitz, 1976)
- Acrossus formosanus (Nomura & Nakane, 1951)
- Acrossus gagatinus (Ménétriés, 1832)
- Acrossus haliki (Balthasar, 1932)
- Acrossus histrio (Balthasar, 1932)
- Acrossus hrubanti (Balthasar, 1961)
- Acrossus humerospinosus (Petrovitz, 1958)
- Acrossus igai (Nakane, 1956)
- Acrossus japonicus (Nomura & Nakane, 1951)
- Acrossus jedlickai (Balthasar, 1932)
- Acrossus jeloneki Minkina, 2018
- Acrossus jubingensis (Balthasar, 1967)
- Acrossus klickai (Balthasar, 1932)
- Acrossus kwanhsiensis (Balthasar, 1945)
- Acrossus laticollis (Baudi, 1870)
- Acrossus longepilosus (Schmidt, 1911)
- Acrossus luridus (Fabricius, 1775)
- Acrossus milloti Paulian, 1945
- Acrossus opacipennis (Schmidt, 1910)
- Acrossus planicollis (Reitter, 1890)
- Acrossus ritsemai (Schmidt, 1909)
- Acrossus rubripennis (Horn, 1870)
- Acrossus rufipes (Linnaeus, 1758)
- Acrossus semiopacus (Reitter, 1887)
- Acrossus siculus (Harold, 1862)
- Acrossus superatratus (Nomura & Nakane, 1951)
- Acrossus tiabi (Masumoto, 1988)
- Acrossus tingitanus (Reitter, 1892)
- Acrossus unifasciatus (Nomura & Nakane, 1951)
- Acrossus ustulatus (Harold, 1862)

== Selected former species ==
- Acrossus koreanensis (Kim, 1986)
