= Acrossus superatratus =

Scientific classification
- Kingdom: Animalia
- Phylum: Arthropoda
- Clade: Pancrustacea
- Class: Insecta
- Order: Coleoptera
- Suborder: Polyphaga
- Infraorder: Scarabaeiformia
- Family: Scarabaeidae
- Genus: Acrossus
- Species: A. superatratus

Binomial name
- Acrossus superatratus (Nomura & Nakane, 1951)

Synonyms
- Aphodius (Acrossus) superatratus Nomura & Nakane, 1951; Aphodius (Acrossus) arsenjevi Berlov, 1989

Species of beetle

Acrossus superatratus is a species of beetle of the family Scarabaeidae. It is found in Japan, North Korea, South Korea, the Russian Far East and Siberia.

== Description ==
Adults reach a length of about 6.5–8.5 mm (0.26–0.33 in). They have a weakly shiny, black, oval body, which is convex dorsally.
