= Acrossus klickai =

Scientific classification
- Kingdom: Animalia
- Phylum: Arthropoda
- Clade: Pancrustacea
- Class: Insecta
- Order: Coleoptera
- Suborder: Polyphaga
- Infraorder: Scarabaeiformia
- Family: Scarabaeidae
- Genus: Acrossus
- Species: A. klickai

Binomial name
- Acrossus klickai (Balthasar, 1932)

Synonyms
- Aphodius (Acrossus) klickai Balthasar, 1932

Species of beetle

Acrossus klickai is a species of beetle of the family Scarabaeidae. It is found in China (Sichuan).

== Description ==
Adults reach a length of about 10–11 mm (0.39–0.43 in). They have a black, glabrous body, with the antennal club dark.
