= Acrossus depressus =

Scientific classification
- Kingdom: Animalia
- Phylum: Arthropoda
- Clade: Pancrustacea
- Class: Insecta
- Order: Coleoptera
- Suborder: Polyphaga
- Infraorder: Scarabaeiformia
- Family: Scarabaeidae
- Genus: Acrossus
- Species: A. depressus

Binomial name
- Acrossus depressus (Kugelann, 1792)

Synonyms
- Scarabaeus depressus Kugelann, 1792; Acrossus depressus nigrolineatus Dellacasa & Dellacasa, 2005; Acrossus depressus plutenkoi Berlov, 1989; Aphodius depressus circumlineatus Schmidt, 1917; Aphodius depressus kolbeanus Schmidt, 1917; Aphodius depressus humeralis Kolbe, 1911; Aphodius (Acrossus) depressus biceps Dalla Torre, 1879; Aphodius (Acrossus) depressus marginatus Dalla Torre, 1879; Aphodius (Acrossus) depressus rufus Dalla Torre, 1879; Aphodius squalidissimus Gistel, 1857; Aphodius atramentarius Erichson, 1848; Aphodius caminarius Faldermann, 1836; Aphodius fennicus Sahlberg; Aphodius nigripes Stephens, 1830

Species of beetle

Acrossus depressus is a species of beetle of the family Scarabaeidae. It is found in Albania, Armenia, Austria, Azerbaijan, Belarus, Belgium, Bosnia and Herzegovina, China (Sichuan), Croatia, the Czech Republic, Denmark, Estonia, Finland, France, Georgia, Germany, Great Britain, Greece, Hungary, Iran, Ireland, Italy, Kazakhstan, Korea, Kyrgyzstan, Latvia, Lithuania, Macedonia, Mongolia, Montenegro, the Netherlands, Norway, Poland, Portugal, Romania, Russia (including the Russian Far East and Siberia), Serbia, Slovakia, Spain, Sweden, Switzerland, Tajikistan, Turkey and Ukraine.

== Description ==
Adults reach a length of about 6–9 mm (0.24–0.35 in). They have a shiny, quite strongly convex, glabrous body. The head and pronotum are black, while the elytra are reddish-brown, sometimes with a darker spot and sometimes completely black.

== Life history ==
Specimens have been collected from pig, horse, cow, human and sheep dung.
