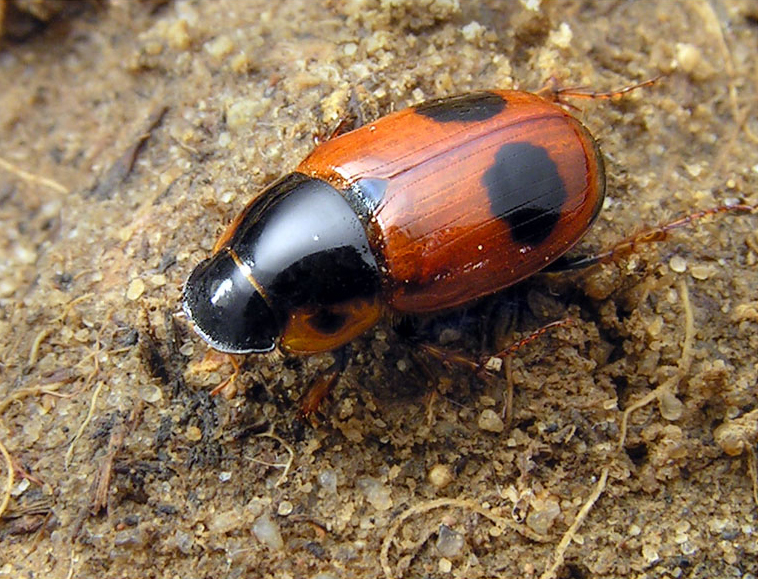

Scientific classification
- Kingdom: Animalia
- Phylum: Arthropoda
- Clade: Pancrustacea
- Class: Insecta
- Order: Coleoptera
- Suborder: Polyphaga
- Infraorder: Scarabaeiformia
- Family: Scarabaeidae
- Genus: Acrossus
- Species: A. bimaculatus

Binomial name
- Acrossus bimaculatus (Laxmann, 1770)

Synonyms
- Scarabaeus bimaculatus Laxmann, 1770; Aphodius bipunctatus obscurior Hochhuth, 1873; Scarabaeus coccinelloides Pallas, 1781; Scarabaeus bipunctatus Lepechin, 1775

= Acrossus bimaculatus =

Species of beetle

Acrossus bimaculatus is a species of beetle of the family Scarabaeidae. It is found in Austria, Belarus, the Czech Republic, Estonia, Germany, Kazakhstan, Kyrgyzstan, Latvia, Poland, Russia, Slovakia, Turkmenistan and Ukraine.

== Description ==
Adults reach a length of about 8–12 mm (0.31–0.47 in). They have a rather broadly oval, moderately convex, glabrous, shiny, black body, with the lateral margins of the pronotum and the elytra light or dark red to yellowish-red. There is a roundish, black spot on each elytron.
