= Acrossus atratus =

Scientific classification
- Kingdom: Animalia
- Phylum: Arthropoda
- Clade: Pancrustacea
- Class: Insecta
- Order: Coleoptera
- Suborder: Polyphaga
- Infraorder: Scarabaeiformia
- Family: Scarabaeidae
- Genus: Acrossus
- Species: A. atratus

Binomial name
- Acrossus atratus (Waterhouse, 1875)

Synonyms
- Aphodius atratus Waterhouse, 1875

Species of beetle

Acrossus atratus is a species of beetle of the family Scarabaeidae. It is found in Japan and Taiwan.

== Description ==
Adults reach a length of about 6 mm (0.24 in). They have a fairly shiny, black body, the elytra covered with very short hairs.
