= Acrossus hrubanti =

Scientific classification
- Kingdom: Animalia
- Phylum: Arthropoda
- Clade: Pancrustacea
- Class: Insecta
- Order: Coleoptera
- Suborder: Polyphaga
- Infraorder: Scarabaeiformia
- Family: Scarabaeidae
- Genus: Acrossus
- Species: A. hrubanti

Binomial name
- Acrossus hrubanti (Balthasar, 1961)

Synonyms
- Aphodius (Acrossus) hrubanti Balthasar, 1961

Species of beetle

Acrossus hrubanti is a species of beetle of the family Scarabaeidae. It is found in China (Sichuan).

== Description ==
Adults reach a length of about 9 mm (0.35 in). They have an oblong-oval, blackish-brown to black body, with the front edge of the head and the apical margin of the elytra reddish—translucent.
