= Acrossus milloti =

Scientific classification
- Kingdom: Animalia
- Phylum: Arthropoda
- Clade: Pancrustacea
- Class: Insecta
- Order: Coleoptera
- Suborder: Polyphaga
- Infraorder: Scarabaeiformia
- Family: Scarabaeidae
- Genus: Acrossus
- Species: A. milloti

Binomial name
- Acrossus milloti Paulian, 1945

Synonyms
- Aphodius (Acrossus) milloti

Species of beetle

Acrossus milloti is a species of beetle of the family Scarabaeidae. It is found in Vietnam.

== Description ==
Adults reach a length of about 7 mm (0.28 in). They are brown, with the anterior part of the body somewhat darker. The elytra are reddish-brown, especially at the base, and the tips and sides of the elytra have short, light-colored hairs.
