= Acrossus kwanhsiensis =

Scientific classification
- Kingdom: Animalia
- Phylum: Arthropoda
- Clade: Pancrustacea
- Class: Insecta
- Order: Coleoptera
- Suborder: Polyphaga
- Infraorder: Scarabaeiformia
- Family: Scarabaeidae
- Genus: Acrossus
- Species: A. kwanhsiensis

Binomial name
- Acrossus kwanhsiensis (Balthasar, 1945)

Synonyms
- Aphodius (Acrossus) kwanhsiensis Balthasar, 1945

Species of beetle

Acrossus kwanhsiensis is a species of beetle of the family Scarabaeidae. It is found in China (Sichuan).

== Description ==
Adults reach a length of about 8.5–10 mm (0.33–0.39 in). They have a glabrous, black body. In females, the elytra are very indistinctly shagreened toward the apex.
