= Acrossus binaevulus =

Scientific classification
- Kingdom: Animalia
- Phylum: Arthropoda
- Clade: Pancrustacea
- Class: Insecta
- Order: Coleoptera
- Suborder: Polyphaga
- Infraorder: Scarabaeiformia
- Family: Scarabaeidae
- Genus: Acrossus
- Species: A. binaevulus

Binomial name
- Acrossus binaevulus (Heyden, 1887)

Synonyms
- Aphodius (Acrossus) binaevulus Heyden, 1887; Aphodius (Acrossus) bineavulus nigra Tesař, 1945; Aphodius (Acrossus) binaevulus diaphanomaculatus Heyden, 1887

Species of beetle

Acrossus binaevulus is a species of beetle of the family Scarabaeidae. It is found in India (Sikkim), Korea, Nepal and Russia (including the Russian Far East and Siberia).

== Description ==
Adults reach a length of about 8–10 mm (0.31–0.39 in). They have a strongly convex body. The dorsal surface is black, normally with yellowish-red to red patterns on the elytra, but the elytra are sometimes completely red or black.
