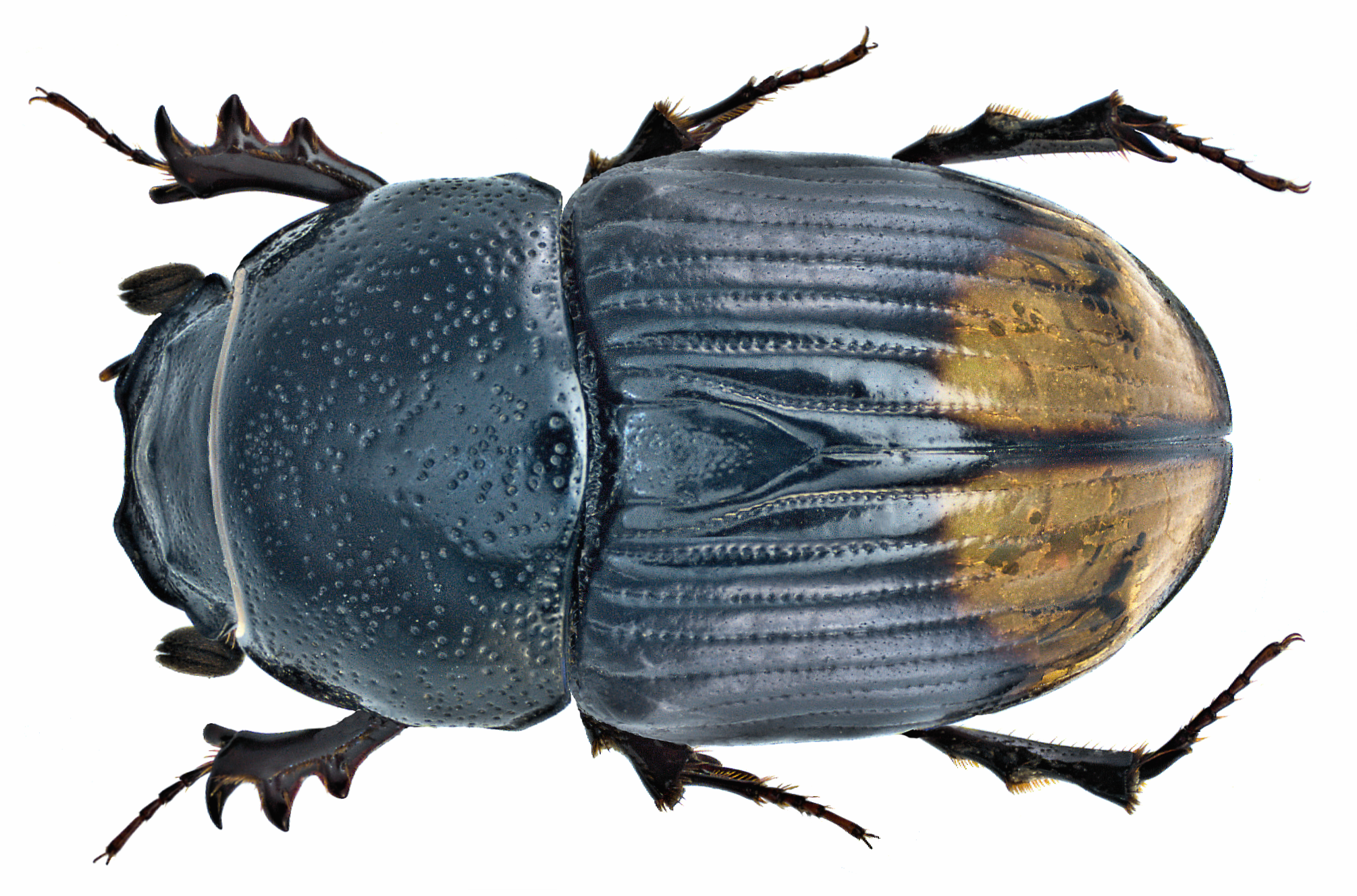
- Teuchestes analis, Vietnam

Scientific classification
- Kingdom: Animalia
- Phylum: Arthropoda
- Clade: Pancrustacea
- Class: Insecta
- Order: Coleoptera
- Suborder: Polyphaga
- Infraorder: Scarabaeiformia
- Family: Scarabaeidae
- Subfamily: Aphodiinae
- Tribe: Aphodiini
- Genus: Teuchestes; Mulsant, 1842

= Teuchestes =

Genus of beetles

Teuchestes is a genus of scarab beetles in the family Scarabaeidae. There are about 10 described species in Teuchestes, found worldwide.

== Species ==
These 10 species belong to the genus Teuchestes:

- Teuchestes analis (Fabricius, 1787)
- Teuchestes brachysomus (Solsky, 1874)
- Teuchestes caffer (Wiedemann, 1823)
- Teuchestes dejeani (Harold, 1862)
- Teuchestes fossor (Linnaeus, 1758)
- Teuchestes guangdong Rakovič & Mencl, 2012
- Teuchestes hongson Rakovič & Mencl, 2012
- Teuchestes sinofraternus (Dellacasa & Johnson, 1983)
- Teuchestes uenoi Ochi, Kawahara & Kon, 2006
- Teuchestes wicheri (Dellacasa & Johnson, 1983)
