= Acrossus carpetanus =

Scientific classification
- Kingdom: Animalia
- Phylum: Arthropoda
- Clade: Pancrustacea
- Class: Insecta
- Order: Coleoptera
- Suborder: Polyphaga
- Infraorder: Scarabaeiformia
- Family: Scarabaeidae
- Genus: Acrossus
- Species: A. carpetanus

Binomial name
- Acrossus carpetanus (Graëlls, 1847)

Synonyms
- Aphodius carpetanus Graëlls, 1847

Species of beetle

Acrossus carpetanus is a species of beetle of the family Scarabaeidae. It is found in Spain.

== Description ==
Adults reach a length of about 11–14 mm (0.43–0.55 in). They are black, with the elytra blackish-brown to dark brown, and moderately shiny. The antennae are light brown and the underside and legs are brown. The elytra have very short pubescence.
