= Acrossus haliki =

Scientific classification
- Kingdom: Animalia
- Phylum: Arthropoda
- Clade: Pancrustacea
- Class: Insecta
- Order: Coleoptera
- Suborder: Polyphaga
- Infraorder: Scarabaeiformia
- Family: Scarabaeidae
- Genus: Acrossus
- Species: A. haliki

Binomial name
- Acrossus haliki (Balthasar, 1932)

Synonyms
- Aphodius (Acrossus) haliki Balthasar, 1932

Species of beetle

Acrossus haliki is a species of beetle of the family Scarabaeidae. It is found in China (Shaanxi, Sichuan).

== Description ==
Adults reach a length of about 6–7 mm (0.24–0.28 in). They have a quite convex, shiny, black body. The elytra have some tiny hairs toward the apex.
