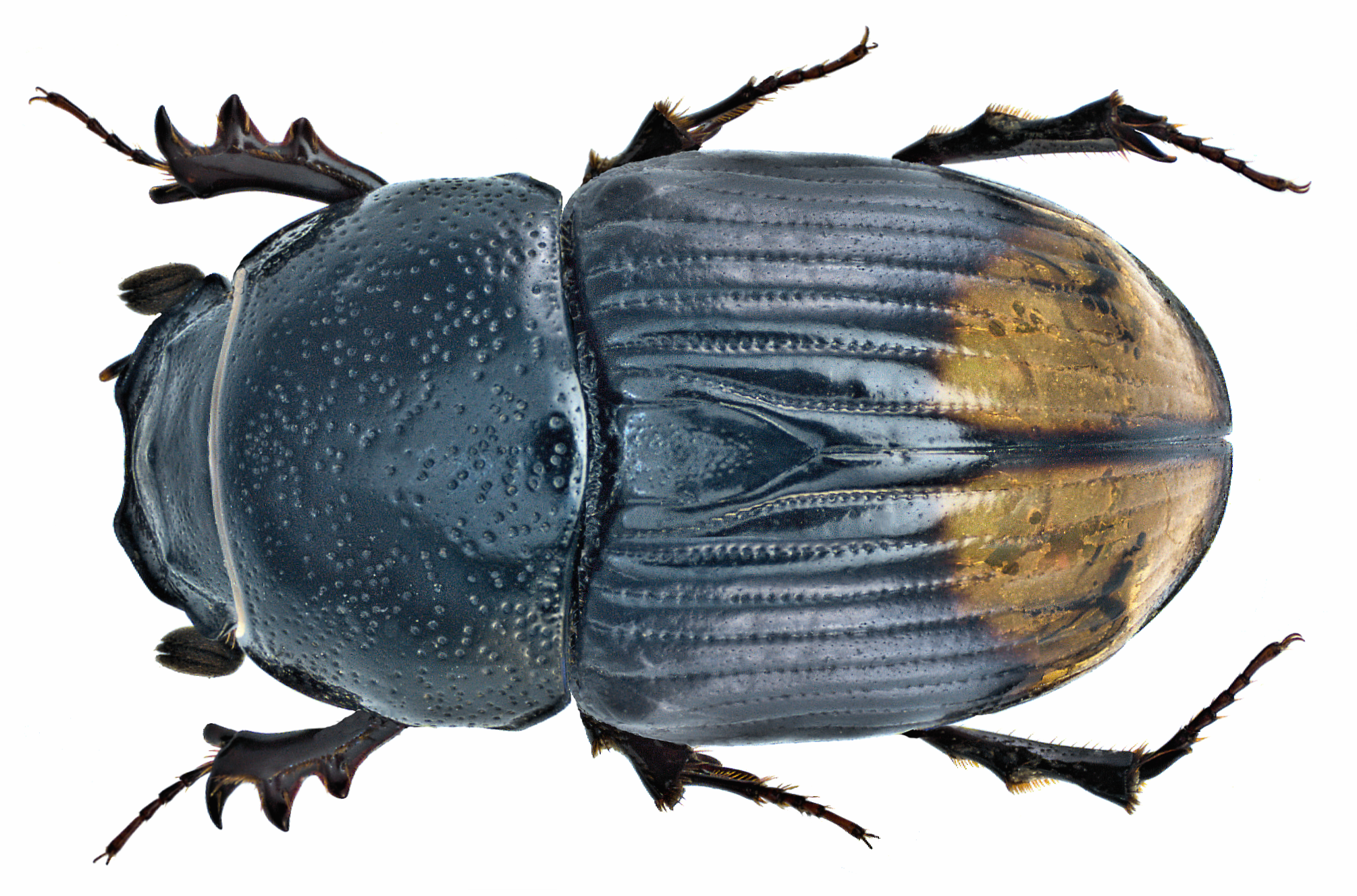

Scientific classification
- Kingdom: Animalia
- Phylum: Arthropoda
- Clade: Pancrustacea
- Class: Insecta
- Order: Coleoptera
- Suborder: Polyphaga
- Infraorder: Scarabaeiformia
- Family: Scarabaeidae
- Genus: Teuchestes
- Species: T. analis

Binomial name
- Teuchestes analis (Fabricius, 1787)

Synonyms
- Scarabaeus analis Fabricius, 1787; Aphodius (Teuchestes) sorex beckeri Mader, 1938; Aphodius cinctipennis Chevrolat; Colobopterus (Teuchestes) analis niger Landin, 1974; Scarabaeus sorex Fabricius, 1792

= Teuchestes analis =

Species of beetle

Teuchestes analis is a species of beetle of the family Scarabaeidae. It is found in Bhutan, China (Chongqing, Fujian, Guangdong, Guizhou, Hong Kong, Shaanxi, Xizang), India (Sikkim), Japan, Nepal, Taiwan, Vietnam, Ethiopia, South Africa and Australia.

== Description ==
Adults reach a length of about 9–10.5 mm (0.35–0.41 in). They have a strongly arched, glossy, glabrous, black body. The elytra are yellowish-brown or yellowish-red with the suture, base and the lateral margin blackened.
