= Acrossus planicollis =

Scientific classification
- Kingdom: Animalia
- Phylum: Arthropoda
- Clade: Pancrustacea
- Class: Insecta
- Order: Coleoptera
- Suborder: Polyphaga
- Infraorder: Scarabaeiformia
- Family: Scarabaeidae
- Genus: Acrossus
- Species: A. planicollis

Binomial name
- Acrossus planicollis (Reitter, 1890)

Synonyms
- Aphodius planicollis Reitter, 1890; Aphodius (Acrossus) planicollis rufohumeralis Baraud, 1976; Aphodius gagatinus Harold, 1862

Species of beetle

Acrossus planicollis is a species of beetle of the family Scarabaeidae. It is found in Armenia, Azerbaijan, Georgia, Russia and Turkey.

== Description ==
Adults reach a length of about 12–15 mm (0.47–0.59 in). They are black or blackish-brown, with the elytra sometimes darker brown. They are fairly shiny and glabrous. The antennal club is dark yellowish-brown.
