= Acrossus semiopacus =

Scientific classification
- Kingdom: Animalia
- Phylum: Arthropoda
- Clade: Pancrustacea
- Class: Insecta
- Order: Coleoptera
- Suborder: Polyphaga
- Infraorder: Scarabaeiformia
- Family: Scarabaeidae
- Genus: Acrossus
- Species: A. semiopacus

Binomial name
- Acrossus semiopacus (Reitter, 1887)

Synonyms
- Aphodius (Acrossus) semiopacus Reitter, 1887; Aphodius (Acrossus) semiopacus luteoirroratus Heyden, 1889

Species of beetle

Acrossus semiopacus is a species of beetle of the family Scarabaeidae. It is found in China (Gansu, Sichuan, Xinjiang, Xizang).

== Description ==
Adults reach a length of about 9–10.5 mm (0.35–0.41 in). They have an oblong-oval, weakly convex body. The upper surface is glabrous. The elytra are dull, with a silky texture.
