= Acrossus ustulatus =

Scientific classification
- Kingdom: Animalia
- Phylum: Arthropoda
- Clade: Pancrustacea
- Class: Insecta
- Order: Coleoptera
- Suborder: Polyphaga
- Infraorder: Scarabaeiformia
- Family: Scarabaeidae
- Genus: Acrossus
- Species: A. ustulatus

Binomial name
- Acrossus ustulatus (Harold, 1862)

Synonyms
- Aphodius ustulatus Harold, 1862

Species of beetle

Acrossus ustulatus is a species of beetle of the family Scarabaeidae. It is found in India (Uttarakhand).

== Description ==
Adults reach a length of about 8 mm (0.31 in). They have a slightly convex, glossy, black body. The elytra are dull and yellow, with a dark patch.
