= Acrossus histrio =

Scientific classification
- Kingdom: Animalia
- Phylum: Arthropoda
- Clade: Pancrustacea
- Class: Insecta
- Order: Coleoptera
- Suborder: Polyphaga
- Infraorder: Scarabaeiformia
- Family: Scarabaeidae
- Genus: Acrossus
- Species: A. histrio

Binomial name
- Acrossus histrio (Balthasar, 1932)

Synonyms
- Aphodius (Acrossus) histrio Balthasar, 1932

Species of beetle

Acrossus histrio is a species of beetle of the family Scarabaeidae. It is found in China (Sichuan).

== Description ==
Adults reach a length of about 10–12 mm (0.39–0.47 in). They have a moderately convex, glabrous, black body. The forebody is fairly shiny and the elytra are shagreened (especially at the base) while the sutural interval is shiny. The antennal club is dark.
