= Acrossus opacipennis =

Scientific classification
- Kingdom: Animalia
- Phylum: Arthropoda
- Clade: Pancrustacea
- Class: Insecta
- Order: Coleoptera
- Suborder: Polyphaga
- Infraorder: Scarabaeiformia
- Family: Scarabaeidae
- Genus: Acrossus
- Species: A. opacipennis

Binomial name
- Acrossus opacipennis (Schmidt, 1910)

Synonyms
- Aphodius (Acrossus) opacipennis Schmidt, 1910

Species of beetle

Acrossus opacipennis is a species of beetle of the family Scarabaeidae. It is found in China (Sichuan), Sikkim and Nepal.

== Description ==
Adults reach a length of about 9–10 mm (0.35–0.39 in). They have a convex, glabrous, black, and shiny body. The apical part of the elytra is shagreened and dull and the antennal club is dark.
