= Acrossus formosanus =

Scientific classification
- Kingdom: Animalia
- Phylum: Arthropoda
- Clade: Pancrustacea
- Class: Insecta
- Order: Coleoptera
- Suborder: Polyphaga
- Infraorder: Scarabaeiformia
- Family: Scarabaeidae
- Genus: Acrossus
- Species: A. formosanus

Binomial name
- Acrossus formosanus (Nomura & Nakane, 1951)

Synonyms
- Aphodius (Acrossus) formosanus Nomura & Nakane, 1951

Species of beetle

Acrossus formosanus is a species of beetle of the family Scarabaeidae. It is found in Taiwan.

== Description ==
Adults reach a length of about 6.5 mm (0.26 in). They have a shiny, black body, the elytra with very fine hairs at the tip.
