= Acrossus rubripennis =

Scientific classification
- Kingdom: Animalia
- Phylum: Arthropoda
- Clade: Pancrustacea
- Class: Insecta
- Order: Coleoptera
- Suborder: Polyphaga
- Infraorder: Scarabaeiformia
- Family: Scarabaeidae
- Genus: Acrossus
- Species: A. rubripennis

Binomial name
- Acrossus rubripennis (Horn, 1870)

Synonyms
- Aphodius rubripennis Horn, 1870

Species of beetle

Acrossus rubripennis, the red-winged small dung beetle, is a species of beetle of the family Scarabaeidae. It is found in Canada (New Brunswick, Nova Scotia, Ontario, Quebec) and the United States (Maryland, Michigan, North Carolina, Ohio, Wisconsin).

== Description ==
Adults reach a length of about 7–7.5 mm (0.28–0.30 in). They have an oblong, slightly depressed, black, shining body. The elytra are reddish-yellow, sub-opaque and pubescent.

== Etymology ==
The species name is derived from Latin ruber (meaning red) and penna (meaning wing) and refers to the reddish elytra.
