= Acrossus japonicus =

Scientific classification
- Kingdom: Animalia
- Phylum: Arthropoda
- Clade: Pancrustacea
- Class: Insecta
- Order: Coleoptera
- Suborder: Polyphaga
- Infraorder: Scarabaeiformia
- Family: Scarabaeidae
- Genus: Acrossus
- Species: A. japonicus

Binomial name
- Acrossus japonicus (Nomura & Nakane, 1951)

Synonyms
- Aphodius (Acrossus) japonicus Nomura & Nakane, 1951

Species of beetle

Acrossus japonicus is a species of beetle of the family Scarabaeidae. It is found in Japan (Honshu).

== Description ==
Adults reach a length of about 6.5–8.5 mm (0.26–0.33 in). They have a quite convex, glossy, black, completely glabrous body.
