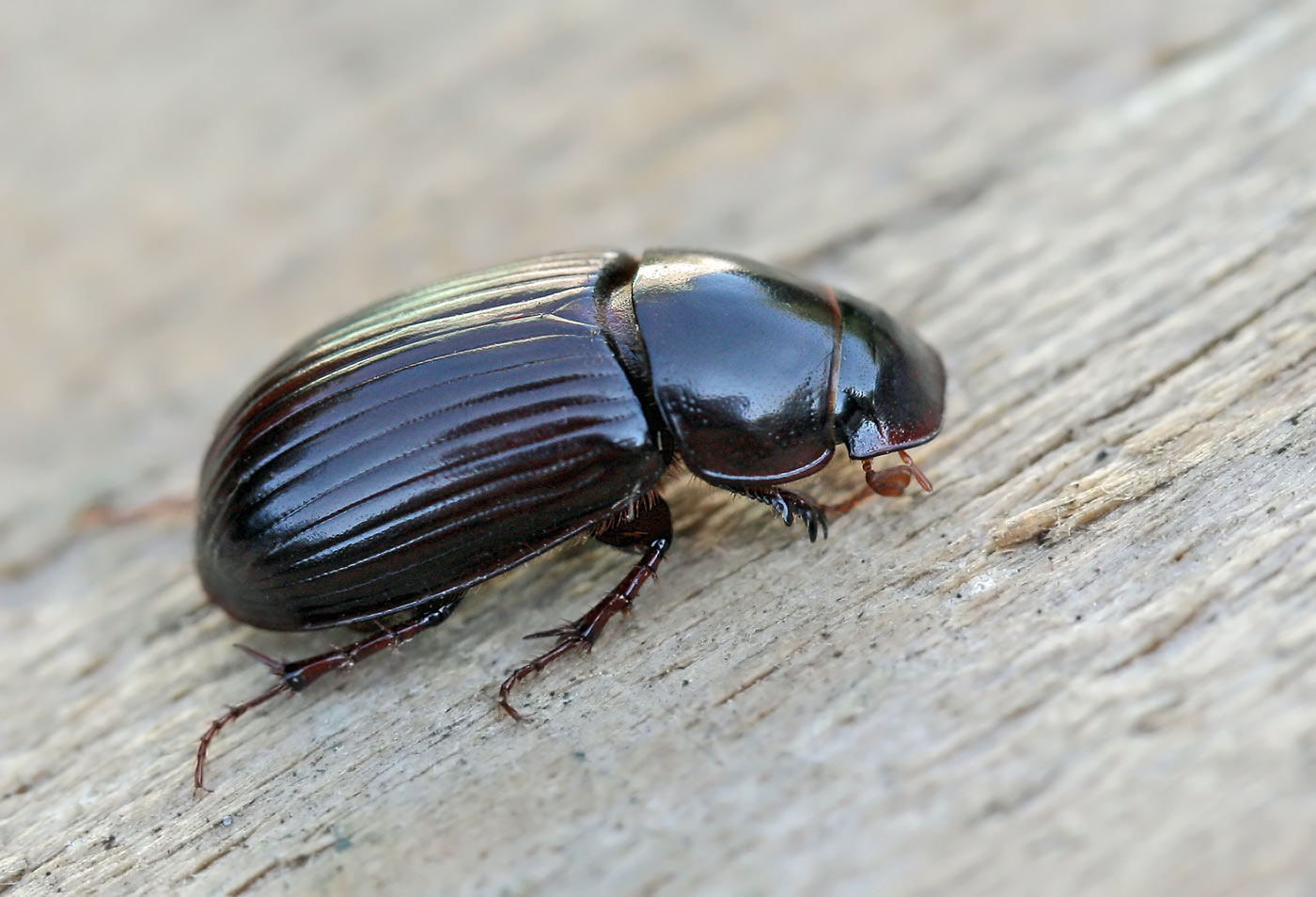

Scientific classification
- Kingdom: Animalia
- Phylum: Arthropoda
- Clade: Pancrustacea
- Class: Insecta
- Order: Coleoptera
- Suborder: Polyphaga
- Infraorder: Scarabaeiformia
- Family: Scarabaeidae
- Genus: Acrossus
- Species: A. rufipes

Binomial name
- Acrossus rufipes (Linnaeus, 1758)

Synonyms
- Scarabaeus rufipes Linnaeus, 1758; Aphodius rufipes; Aphodius matsuzawai Yawata, 1943; Aphodius (Acrossus) rufipes rufotestacea Dalla Torre, 1879; Aphodius capicola Harold, 1862; Aphodius boum Gistel, 1857; Acrossus rufipes juvenilis Mulsant, 1842; Aphodius muticus Stephens, 1830; Scarabaeus capitatus Degeer, 1774; Scarabaeus oblongus Scopoli, 1763

= Acrossus rufipes =

Species of beetle

Acrossus rufipes, the night-flying dung beetle, is a species of scarab beetle. It was first recorded by the zoologist Carl Linnaeus as Acrossus rufipes in his 10th edition of Systema Naturae. The species was more recently considered a member of the genus Aphodius, but is now again classified as Acrossus rufipes.

Acrossus rufipes is found in the Palearctic and North America.

== Etymology ==
The species name rufipes is Latin for "red foot". It shares this name with a number of other species including the spider Sphodros rufipes.

Its British common name "the night-flying dung beetle" is given due to it being common for it to mistakenly find its way on its night-time flight from the dung-fields, to artificial lights among human habitation.

== Description ==
The outer body ranges from dark brown to black, while the legs are black with a red tinge. At 9–13 millimetres (0.35–0.51 in) in size, it is one of the largest of the genus Aphodius. It has ten ridges on each of its wing-covers (called elytra). It has a shovel-shaped head which it used to move the earth when it burrows.

== Behaviour ==
Acrossus rufipes burrowing

This species feeds and breeds in various types of dung, and in the British Isles it is usually seen between the months of April and October. The beetle is particularly sensitive to light. During the daytime hours or under artificial light, it instinctively burrows into the nearest moist soil or preferably fresh dung. From at least 4 centimetres (1.6 in) underneath the soil it is able to sense that night has fallen, since it soon emerges from the soil when all light is extinguished, and prepares for its night-time flight in search of mates or new sources of food.

== Symbiosis ==
The beetle has a symbiotic relationship with at least one species of mite, which is able to latch-on to the beetle's body beneath its hard shell, and remain securely attached when the beetle is burrowing or flying. The beetle thus provides the mites with safety and transport, while the mites are known to feed on mould in the dung, that would otherwise cause the beetle's source of food to decompose.
