= Agoliinus aleutus =

Scientific classification
- Kingdom: Animalia
- Phylum: Arthropoda
- Clade: Pancrustacea
- Class: Insecta
- Order: Coleoptera
- Suborder: Polyphaga
- Infraorder: Scarabaeiformia
- Family: Scarabaeidae
- Genus: Agoliinus
- Species: A. aleutus

Binomial name
- Agoliinus aleutus (Eschscholtz, 1822)

Synonyms
- Aphodius aleutus Eschscholtz, 1822; Aphodius ursinus Motschulsky, 1845

Species of beetle

Agoliinus aleutus is a species of beetle of the family Scarabaeidae. It is found in the Russian Far East, Canada (Alberta, British Columbia) and the United States (Alaska, California, Colorado, New Mexico, Oregon, Washington).

== Description ==
Adults reach a length of about 6 mm (0.24 in). They are very similar to Agoliinus lapponum, but the elytra are darker red, the sides of the pronotum are usually entirely pale and the head is rather evenly punctate.
