= Agoliinus storkani =

Scientific classification
- Kingdom: Animalia
- Phylum: Arthropoda
- Clade: Pancrustacea
- Class: Insecta
- Order: Coleoptera
- Suborder: Polyphaga
- Infraorder: Scarabaeiformia
- Family: Scarabaeidae
- Genus: Agoliinus
- Species: A. storkani

Binomial name
- Agoliinus storkani (Balthasar, 1932)

Synonyms
- Aphodius storkani Balthasar, 1932

Species of beetle

Agoliinus storkani is a species of beetle of the family Scarabaeidae. It is found in China (Sichuan).

== Description ==
Adults reach a length of about 6–7 mm (0.24–0.28 in). They have an elongate-oval, quite strongly convex, black body, with the tip of the elytra sometimes reddish. The forebody is shining, while the elytra are nearly dull (and completely dull along the sides and at the apex). The legs are blackish-brown.
