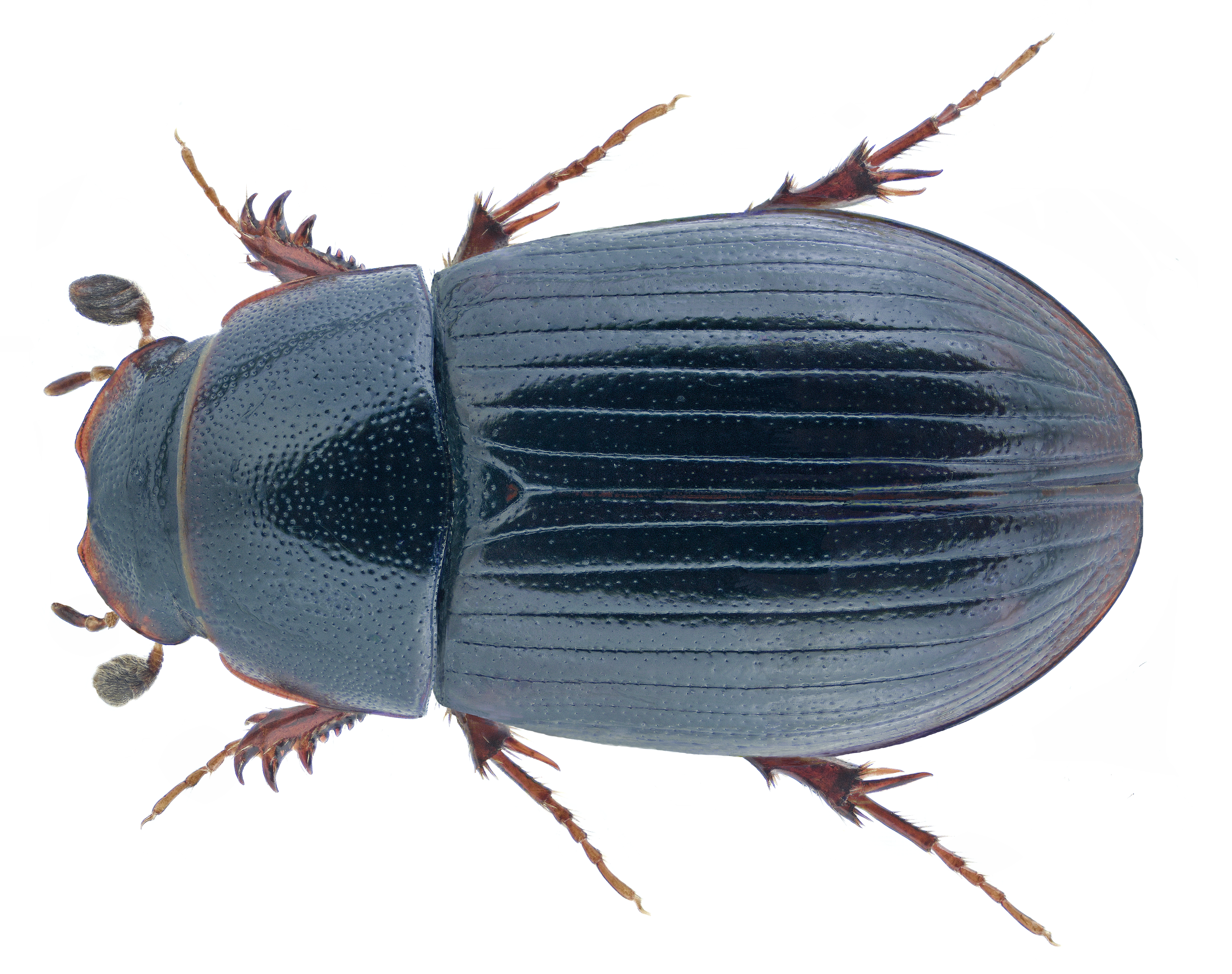
- Agoliinus nemoralis, Germany

Scientific classification
- Kingdom: Animalia
- Phylum: Arthropoda
- Clade: Pancrustacea
- Class: Insecta
- Order: Coleoptera
- Suborder: Polyphaga
- Infraorder: Scarabaeiformia
- Family: Scarabaeidae
- Subfamily: Aphodiinae
- Tribe: Aphodiini
- Genus: Agoliinus; Schmidt, 1913

= Agoliinus =

Genus of beetles

Agoliinus is a genus of beetles belonging to the family Scarabaeidae.

The species of this genus are found in Europe, Asia, North America, and Central America.

== Species ==
These 43 species belong to the genus Agoliinus. Many of these species were transferred from the genus Aphodius.

- Agoliinus albertanus (Brown, 1928)
- Agoliinus aleutus (Eschscholtz, 1822)
- Agoliinus amurensis (Iablokov-khnzorian, 1972)
- Agoliinus anthracus Gordon & Skelley, 2007
- Agoliinus aquilonarius (Brown, 1928)
- Agoliinus ashworthi (Gordon, 2006)
- Agoliinus bidentatus (Schmidt, 1906)
- Agoliinus canadensis (Garnett, 1920)
- Agoliinus congregatus (Mannerheim, 1853)
- Agoliinus corruptor (Brown, 1929)
- Agoliinus cruentatus (LeConte, 1878)
- Agoliinus durrelli Rakovič & Mencl, 2011
- Agoliinus explanatus (LeConte, 1878)
- Agoliinus guttatus (Eschscholtz, 1823)
- Agoliinus hatchi Gordon & Skelley, 2007
- Agoliinus idahoensis Gordon & Skelley, 2007
- Agoliinus incommunis (Fall, 1932)
- Agoliinus ingenursus Gordon & Skelley, 2007
- Agoliinus isajevi (Kabakov, 1996)
- Agoliinus kiuchii (Masumoto, 1984)
- Agoliinus lapponum (Gyllenhal, 1808)
- Agoliinus leopardus (Horn, 1870)
- Agoliinus malkini (Hatch, 1971)
- Agoliinus manitobensis (Brown, 1928)
- Agoliinus morii (Nakane, 1983)
- Agoliinus nemoralis (Erichson, 1848)
- Agoliinus parastorkani (Červenka, 1995)
- Agoliinus piceatus (Robinson, 1946)
- Agoliinus piceus (Gyllenhal, 1808)
- Agoliinus pittinoi (Carpaneto, 1986)
- Agoliinus plutonicus (Fall, 1907)
- Agoliinus poudreus Gordon & Skelley, 2007
- Agoliinus praealtus Gordon & Skelley, 2007
- Agoliinus pseudostorkani (Stebnicka, 1982)
- Agoliinus ragusae (Reitter, 1892)
- Agoliinus satunini (Olsoufieff, 1918)
- Agoliinus satyrus (Reitter, 1892)
- Agoliinus setchan (Masumoto, 1984)
- Agoliinus shibatai (Nakane, 1983)
- Agoliinus sigmoideus (Van Dyke, 1918)
- Agoliinus storkani (Balthasar, 1932)
- Agoliinus tanakai (Masumoto, 1981)
- Agoliinus wickhami (Brown, 1928)
