= Agoliinus congregatus =

Scientific classification
- Kingdom: Animalia
- Phylum: Arthropoda
- Clade: Pancrustacea
- Class: Insecta
- Order: Coleoptera
- Suborder: Polyphaga
- Infraorder: Scarabaeiformia
- Family: Scarabaeidae
- Genus: Agoliinus
- Species: A. congregatus

Binomial name
- Agoliinus congregatus (Mannerheim, 1853)

Synonyms
- Aphodius congregatus Mannerheim, 1853; Aphodius (Agoliinus) richardsonae Hatch, 1971; Aphodius arcticus Harold, 1863

Species of beetle

Agoliinus congregatus is a species of beetle of the family Scarabaeidae. It is found in the United States (Alaska, California, Colorado, Montana, Washington) and Canada (Alberta, British Columbia).

== Description ==
Adults reach a length of about 4–6 mm (0.16–0.24 in). They have an elongate-oval, convex, shiny, glabrous body. They are blackish, sometimes with the elytra with reddish spots, or brownish with darker spots.
