= Agoliinus ragusae =

Scientific classification
- Kingdom: Animalia
- Phylum: Arthropoda
- Clade: Pancrustacea
- Class: Insecta
- Order: Coleoptera
- Suborder: Polyphaga
- Infraorder: Scarabaeiformia
- Family: Scarabaeidae
- Genus: Agoliinus
- Species: A. ragusae

Binomial name
- Agoliinus ragusae (Reitter, 1892)

Synonyms
- Aphodius (Amidorus) ragusae Reitter, 1892

Species of beetle

Agoliinus ragusae is a species of beetle of the family Scarabaeidae. It is found in Italy (Sicily).

== Description ==
Adults reach a length of about 6.5 mm (0.26 in). They have an elongate-oval, moderately convex, shiny, black body. The elytra are brownish-red with a darkened suture and the legs are brown.
