= Agoliinus piceus =

Scientific classification
- Kingdom: Animalia
- Phylum: Arthropoda
- Clade: Pancrustacea
- Class: Insecta
- Order: Coleoptera
- Suborder: Polyphaga
- Infraorder: Scarabaeiformia
- Family: Scarabaeidae
- Genus: Agoliinus
- Species: A. piceus

Binomial name
- Agoliinus piceus (Gyllenhal, 1808)

Synonyms
- Aphodius piceus Gyllenhal, 1808; Aphodius ambulans Gistel, 1857; Aphodius alpicola Mulsant, 1842; Aphodius alpicola orobius Mulsant, 1842; Aphodius melanarius Germar, 1823

Species of beetle

Agoliinus piceus is a species of beetle of the family Scarabaeidae. It is found in Austria, Croatia, the Czech Republic, Denmark, Estonia, Finland, France, Georgia, Germany, Italy, Kazakhstan, Latvia, Lithuania, Mongolia, Norway, Poland, Romania, Russia (including the Russian Far East and Siberia), Slovakia, Slovenia, Sweden, Switzerland and Ukraine.

== Description ==
Adults reach a length of about 5–6 mm (0.20–0.24 in). They have a quite strongly convex, shiny, glabrous, black body, with the anterior margin of the head and often also the tips of the elytra reddish.
