= Agoliinus satunini =

Scientific classification
- Kingdom: Animalia
- Phylum: Arthropoda
- Clade: Pancrustacea
- Class: Insecta
- Order: Coleoptera
- Suborder: Polyphaga
- Infraorder: Scarabaeiformia
- Family: Scarabaeidae
- Genus: Agoliinus
- Species: A. satunini

Binomial name
- Agoliinus satunini (Olsoufieff, 1918)

Synonyms
- Aphodius (Agrilinus) satunini Olsoufieff, 1918

Species of beetle

Agoliinus satunini is a species of beetle of the family Scarabaeidae. It is found in Siberia.

== Description ==
They are black, with the elytra dark reddish-brown and glossy.
