= Agoliinus pseudostorkani =

Scientific classification
- Kingdom: Animalia
- Phylum: Arthropoda
- Clade: Pancrustacea
- Class: Insecta
- Order: Coleoptera
- Suborder: Polyphaga
- Infraorder: Scarabaeiformia
- Family: Scarabaeidae
- Genus: Agoliinus
- Species: A. pseudostorkani

Binomial name
- Agoliinus pseudostorkani (Stebnicka, 1982)

Synonyms
- Aphodius (Agrilinus) pseudostorkani Stebnicka, 1982

Species of beetle

Agoliinus pseudostorkani is a species of beetle of the family Scarabaeidae. It is found in China (Sichuan).

== Description ==
Adults reach a length of about 6–6.2 mm (0.24–0.24 in). They have an oblong-oval, convex, moderately shining, piceous body, with the apex of the elytra brownish.
