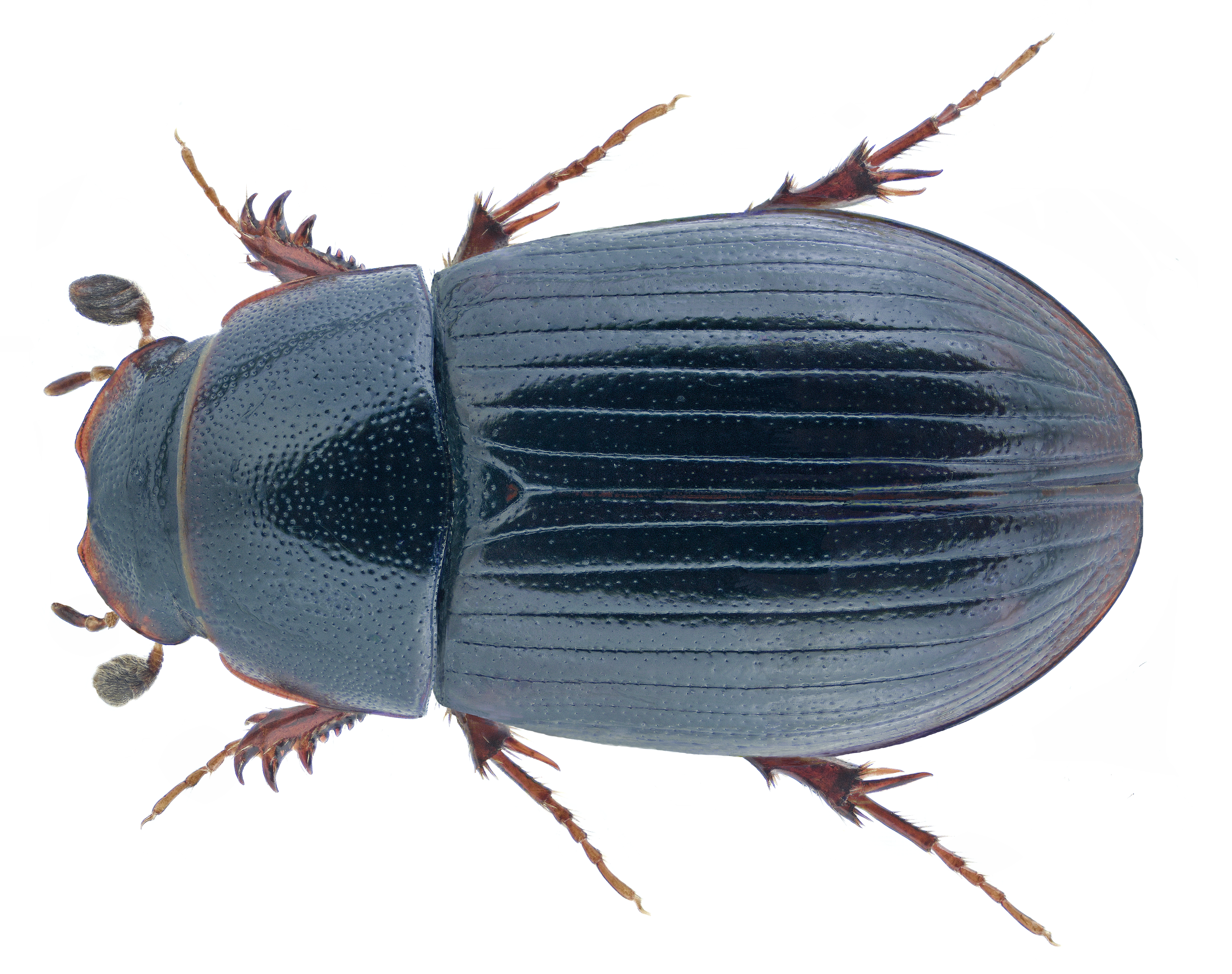

Scientific classification
- Kingdom: Animalia
- Phylum: Arthropoda
- Clade: Pancrustacea
- Class: Insecta
- Order: Coleoptera
- Suborder: Polyphaga
- Infraorder: Scarabaeiformia
- Family: Scarabaeidae
- Genus: Agoliinus
- Species: A. nemoralis

Binomial name
- Agoliinus nemoralis (Erichson, 1848)

Synonyms
- Aphodius nemoralis Erichson, 1848; Aphodius (Agrilinus) ardoei Landin, 1954; Aphodius nemoralis ferruginus Schmidt, 1917; Aphodius nemoralis ferrugineus Schilsky, 1888

= Agoliinus nemoralis =

Species of beetle

Agoliinus nemoralis is a species of beetle of the family Scarabaeidae. It is found in Austria, Belarus, Belgium, Bulgaria, the Czech Republic, Denmark, Estonia, Finland, France, Germany, Great Britain, Hungary, Italy, Latvia, Lithuania, Norway, Poland, Russia, Slovakia, Slovenia, Sweden, Switzerland and Ukraine.

== Description ==
Adults reach a length of about 4.5–5.5 mm (0.18–0.22 in). They have a moderately convex, glossy, glabrous, black or blackish-brown body, with the margin of the head and the sides of the pronotum lighter. The elytra are sometimes reddish-brown. The legs are rust-red.
