= Agoliinus satyrus =

Scientific classification
- Kingdom: Animalia
- Phylum: Arthropoda
- Clade: Pancrustacea
- Class: Insecta
- Order: Coleoptera
- Suborder: Polyphaga
- Infraorder: Scarabaeiformia
- Family: Scarabaeidae
- Genus: Agoliinus
- Species: A. satyrus

Binomial name
- Agoliinus satyrus (Reitter, 1892)

Synonyms
- Aphodius (Agrilinus) satyrus Reitter, 1892; Aphodius (Agrilinus) kofleri Petrovitz, 1956

Species of beetle

Agoliinus satyrus is a species of beetle of the family Scarabaeidae. It is found in Albania, Austria, Bulgaria, Croatia, France, Georgia, Germany, Italy, Montenegro, Russia, Serbia, Slovenia and Switzerland.

== Description ==
Adults reach a length of about 5–6.5 mm (0.20–0.26 in). They have a quite strongly convex, oblong-oval, shiny, glabrous, black body, with the tips of the elytra sometimes dark reddish-brown. The front legs are light rust-red, while the others are dark rust-red.
