= Agoliinus lapponum =

Scientific classification
- Kingdom: Animalia
- Phylum: Arthropoda
- Clade: Pancrustacea
- Class: Insecta
- Order: Coleoptera
- Suborder: Polyphaga
- Infraorder: Scarabaeiformia
- Family: Scarabaeidae
- Genus: Agoliinus
- Species: A. lapponum

Binomial name
- Agoliinus lapponum (Gyllenhal, 1808)

Synonyms
- Aphodius lapponum Gyllenhal, 1808; Aphodius (Agoliinus) miniatulus Balthasar, 1931; Aphodius lapponum anachoreta Bouskell, 1901; Aphodius lapponum humerata Bouskell, 1901; Aphodius lapponum nigrita Bouskell, 1901; Aphodius sobrinus Harold, 1863; Aphodius subalpinus Hardy, 1847; Aphodius axillaris Stephens, 1839; Aphodius maurus Gebler, 1833; Aphodius rhenonum Zetterstedt, 1828

Species of beetle

Agoliinus lapponum is a species of beetle of the family Scarabaeidae. It is found in Finland, Great Britain, Iceland, Ireland, Kazakhstan, Latvia, Mongolia, Norway, Russia (including the Russian Far East and Siberia), Sweden and Turkmenistan.

== Description ==
Adults reach a length of about 5.5–7.5 mm (0.22–0.30 in). They have a moderately convex, shiny, glabrous, black body, with the anterior angles of the pronotum sometimes reddish. The elytra are reddish-brown with lighter margins or a light spot. The legs are brown.
