= Calamosternus trucidatus =

Scientific classification
- Kingdom: Animalia
- Phylum: Arthropoda
- Clade: Pancrustacea
- Class: Insecta
- Order: Coleoptera
- Suborder: Polyphaga
- Infraorder: Scarabaeiformia
- Family: Scarabaeidae
- Genus: Calamosternus
- Species: C. trucidatus

Binomial name
- Calamosternus trucidatus (Harold, 1863)

Synonyms
- Aphodius trucidatus Harold, 1863; Aphodius humeridens Reitter, 1898; Aphodius (Mendidius) spinosus Koshantschikov, 1894; Aphodius (Calamosternus) trucidatus suturifer Reitter, 1892; Aphodius rutilipennis Harold, 1871

Species of beetle

Calamosternus trucidatus is a species of beetle of the family Scarabaeidae. It is found in Armenia, Azerbaijan, Cyprus, Greece, Iran, Iraq, Israel, Kazakhstan, Kyrgyzstan, Lebanon, Mongolia, Russia, Syria, Tajikistan, Turkey, Turkmenistan and Uzbekistan.

== Description ==
Adults reach a length of about 2.5–4 mm (0.098–0.157 in). They are very similar to Calamosternus granarius, but the head, pronotum and striae of the elytra are more densely punctate.
