= Calamosternus prusai =

Scientific classification
- Kingdom: Animalia
- Phylum: Arthropoda
- Clade: Pancrustacea
- Class: Insecta
- Order: Coleoptera
- Suborder: Polyphaga
- Infraorder: Scarabaeiformia
- Family: Scarabaeidae
- Genus: Calamosternus
- Species: C. prusai

Binomial name
- Calamosternus prusai (Tesař, 1945)

Synonyms
- Aphodius (Calamosternus) prusai Tesař, 1945

Species of beetle

Calamosternus prusai is a species of beetle of the family Scarabaeidae. It is found in Korea.

== Description ==
Adults reach a length of about 4.5–5 mm (0.18–0.20 in). They have an elongate, moderately convex, shiny, glabrous body, with the head, pronotum and scutellum dark brown to blackish-brown. The anterior margin of the head and the anterior angles of the pronotum are yellowish-brown. The elytra are lighter reddish-brown, with the sutural interval darker and the striae blackened. The legs are brown.
