= Calamosternus uniplagiatus =

Scientific classification
- Kingdom: Animalia
- Phylum: Arthropoda
- Clade: Pancrustacea
- Class: Insecta
- Order: Coleoptera
- Suborder: Polyphaga
- Infraorder: Scarabaeiformia
- Family: Scarabaeidae
- Genus: Calamosternus
- Species: C. uniplagiatus

Binomial name
- Calamosternus uniplagiatus (Waterhouse, 1875)

Synonyms
- Aphodius uniplagiatus Waterhouse, 1875; Aphodius (Calamosternus) desuetus Balthasar, 1933

Species of beetle

Calamosternus uniplagiatus is a species of beetle of the family Scarabaeidae. It is found in China (Fujian, Liaoning, Shanghai, Yunnan, Zhejiang), Japan, Korea, the Russian Far East, Taiwan and the Philippines.

== Description ==
Adults reach a length of about 3.8–4.2 mm (0.15–0.17 in). They have an elongate-oval, shiny, glabrous body. The forebody is black, with the anterior margin of the head and the sides of the pronotum reddish. The elytra are reddish-brown with a blackish scutellar spot. The legs are brown.

== Life history ==
Specimens have been collected from cow, sheep, horse and human dung.
