= Calamosternus vexator =

Scientific classification
- Kingdom: Animalia
- Phylum: Arthropoda
- Clade: Pancrustacea
- Class: Insecta
- Order: Coleoptera
- Suborder: Polyphaga
- Infraorder: Scarabaeiformia
- Family: Scarabaeidae
- Genus: Calamosternus
- Species: C. vexator

Binomial name
- Calamosternus vexator (Balthasar, 1933)

Synonyms
- Aphodius (Calamosternus) vexator Balthasar, 1933

Species of beetle

Calamosternus vexator is a species of beetle of the family Scarabaeidae. It is found in Egypt, Iraq and Saudi Arabia.

== Description ==
Adults reach a length of about 4.5 mm (0.18 in). They have a quite strongly convex, shiny, glabrous body. The head, pronotum, scutellum, sutural interval of the elytra and the underside are blackish-brown or dark reddish-brown, while the sides of the pronotum are reddish. The ground colour of the elytra is light yellowish-brown and the legs are reddish.
