= Calamosternus machulkai =

Scientific classification
- Kingdom: Animalia
- Phylum: Arthropoda
- Clade: Pancrustacea
- Class: Insecta
- Order: Coleoptera
- Suborder: Polyphaga
- Infraorder: Scarabaeiformia
- Family: Scarabaeidae
- Genus: Calamosternus
- Species: C. machulkai

Binomial name
- Calamosternus machulkai (Balthasar, 1935)

Synonyms
- Aphodius (Calamosternus) machulkai Balthasar, 1935

Species of beetle

Calamosternus machulkai is a species of beetle of the family Scarabaeidae. It is found in Afghanistan, Iran and Iraq.

== Description ==
Adults reach a length of about 4.2–4.6 mm (0.17–0.18 in). They have a quite strongly convex, highly lustrous, black body, with the margins of the head and the pronotum reddish. The elytra are yellow and the scutellum, the sutural interval, the lateral margin and apex of the elytra are dark brown. The legs are brown.
