= Calamosternus tricornifrons =

Scientific classification
- Kingdom: Animalia
- Phylum: Arthropoda
- Clade: Pancrustacea
- Class: Insecta
- Order: Coleoptera
- Suborder: Polyphaga
- Infraorder: Scarabaeiformia
- Family: Scarabaeidae
- Genus: Calamosternus
- Species: C. tricornifrons

Binomial name
- Calamosternus tricornifrons (Reitter, 1909)

Synonyms
- Aphodius (Calamosternus) tricornifrons Reitter, 1909

Species of beetle

Calamosternus tricornifrons is a species of beetle of the family Scarabaeidae. It is found in Kazakhstan and Turkmenistan.

== Description ==
Adults reach a length of about 4–4.5 mm (0.16–0.18 in). They have an elongate, moderately convex, glossy, glabrous, light reddish- or brownish-yellow body, with the back of the head and pronotum darker brown. The edges of the scutellum and the suture of the elytra are darkened. The legs are yellowish-brown.
