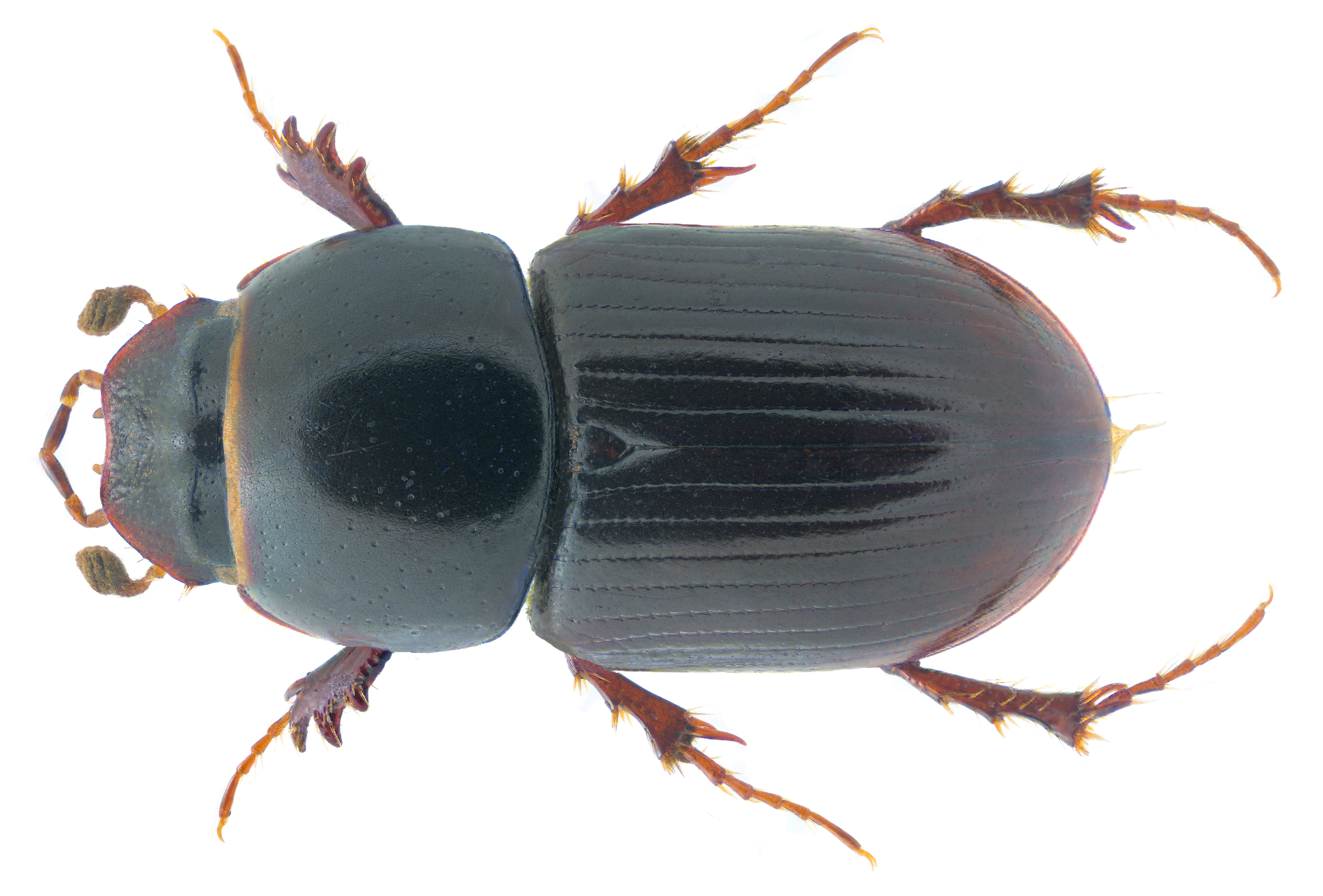
- Calamosternus granarius, Germany

Scientific classification
- Kingdom: Animalia
- Phylum: Arthropoda
- Clade: Pancrustacea
- Class: Insecta
- Order: Coleoptera
- Suborder: Polyphaga
- Infraorder: Scarabaeiformia
- Family: Scarabaeidae
- Subfamily: Aphodiinae
- Tribe: Aphodiini
- Genus: Calamosternus; Motschulsky, 1859

Synonyms
- Aphodius (Megalisus) Mulsant & Rey, 1870

= Calamosternus =

Genus of beetles

Calamosternus is a genus of scarab beetles in the family Scarabaeidae. There are more than 20 described species in Calamosternus.

== Species ==
These 23 species belong to the genus Calamosternus:

- Calamosternus acriculus (Balthasar, 1938)
- Calamosternus algiricus (Mariani & Pittino, 1983)
- Calamosternus boreosinicus (Červenka, 1994)
- Calamosternus ciliaticollis (Petrovitz, 1973)
- Calamosternus colimaensis (Hinton, 1934)
- Calamosternus descarpentriesi (Petrovitz, 1966)
- Calamosternus granarius (Linnaeus, 1767)
- Calamosternus hyxos (Petrovitz, 1962)
- Calamosternus machulkai (Balthasar, 1935)
- Calamosternus magnicollis (Petrovitz, 1969)
- Calamosternus mayeri (Pilleri, 1953)
- Calamosternus prusai (Tesař, 1945)
- Calamosternus pseudolucidus (Rakovič, 1977)
- Calamosternus sauteri (Petrovitz, 1961)
- Calamosternus srinagarensis (Pittino, 2001)
- Calamosternus stercorarius (Mulsant & Rey, 1870)
- Calamosternus subdolus (Petrovitz, 1962)
- Calamosternus tricornifrons (Reitter, 1909)
- Calamosternus trucidatus (Harold, 1863)
- Calamosternus unicolor (Olivier, 1789)
- Calamosternus uniplagiatus (Waterhouse, 1875)
- Calamosternus vexator (Balthasar, 1933)
- Calamosternus zmoskev (Červenka, 1994)
