= Calamosternus acriculus =

Scientific classification
- Kingdom: Animalia
- Phylum: Arthropoda
- Clade: Pancrustacea
- Class: Insecta
- Order: Coleoptera
- Suborder: Polyphaga
- Infraorder: Scarabaeiformia
- Family: Scarabaeidae
- Genus: Calamosternus
- Species: C. acriculus

Binomial name
- Calamosternus acriculus (Balthasar, 1938)

Synonyms
- Aphodius (Calamosternus) acriculus Balthasar, 1938

Species of beetle

Calamosternus acriculus is a species of beetle of the family Scarabaeidae. It is found in Iraq.

== Description ==
Adults reach a length of about 3–4 mm (0.12–0.16 in). They have a strongly convex, short, highly glossy, glabrous body. The head and pronotum are blackish-brown to dark reddish-brown, with lighter lateral margins. The scutellum is dark and the elytra are lighter reddish-brown, with a darkened base and sutural interval. The legs are dark rust-red.
