= Calamosternus unicolor =

Scientific classification
- Kingdom: Animalia
- Phylum: Arthropoda
- Clade: Pancrustacea
- Class: Insecta
- Order: Coleoptera
- Suborder: Polyphaga
- Infraorder: Scarabaeiformia
- Family: Scarabaeidae
- Genus: Calamosternus
- Species: C. unicolor

Binomial name
- Calamosternus unicolor (Olivier, 1789)

Synonyms
- Scarabaeus unicolor Olivier, 1789; Aphodius concolor Sturm, 1843; Aphodius ferrugineus Mulsant, 1842; Aphodius badius Sturm, 1826

Species of beetle

Calamosternus unicolor is a species of beetle of the family Scarabaeidae. It is found in Afghanistan, Algeria, France, Italy (Sicily), Morocco, Saudi Arabia, Spain, Tunisia and Senegal.

== Description ==
Adults reach a length of about 4.5–5.5 mm (0.18–0.22 in). They have an elongate, nearly parallel-sided, strongly convex, highly glossy, light to dark reddish-brown or chestnut-brown body, with the sides of the pronotum somewhat lighter, and the sutural margin of the elytra somewhat darkened. The legs are brown.
