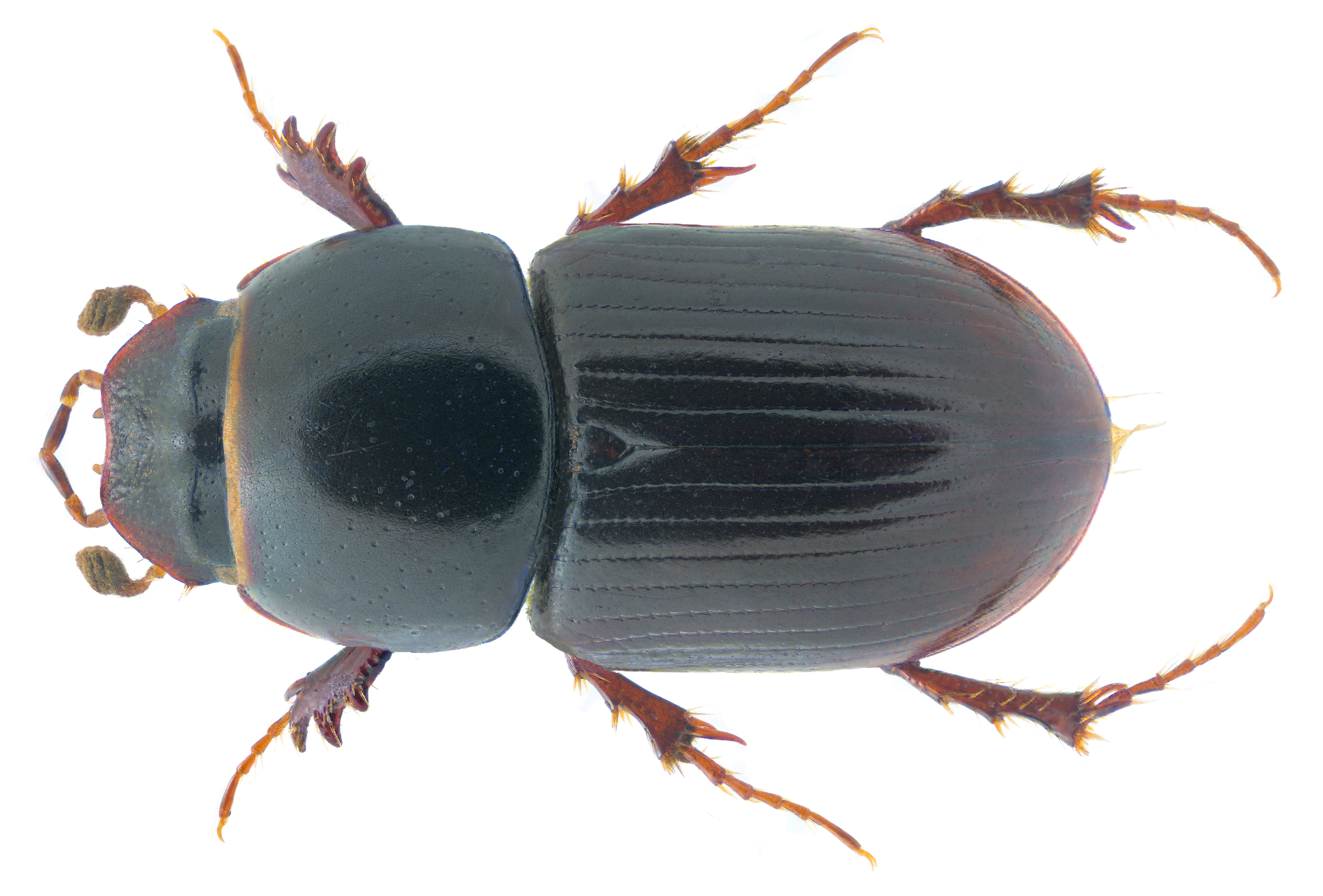

Scientific classification
- Kingdom: Animalia
- Phylum: Arthropoda
- Clade: Pancrustacea
- Class: Insecta
- Order: Coleoptera
- Suborder: Polyphaga
- Infraorder: Scarabaeiformia
- Family: Scarabaeidae
- Subfamily: Aphodiinae
- Tribe: Aphodiini
- Genus: Calamosternus
- Species: C. granarius

Binomial name
- Calamosternus granarius (Linnaeus, 1767)

Synonyms
- Aphodius granarius Linnaeus, 1767; Aphodius (Calamosternus) tomskianus Balthasar, 1973; Aphodius (Loboparius) tilgranicus Nakane, 1966; Aphodius (Agrilinus) pecirkai Balthasar, 1932; Aphodius granarius signatus Schmidt, 1917; Aphodius (Orodalus) nama Kolbe, 1908; Aphodius (Calamosternus) granarius ragusanus Reitter, 1906; Aphodius granarius fusculus Bouskell, 1901; Aphodius (Calamosternus) granarius apicalis Ragusa, 1892; Aphodius (Calamosternus) granarius brunnescens Reitter, 1892; Aphodius inutilis Horn, 1887; Aphodius granarius basilaris Dalla Torre, 1879; Aphodius granarius thoracicus Dalla Torre, 1879; Aphodius vagus Marseul, 1878; Aphodius hypocrita Mulsant & Rey, 1870; Aphodius perezi Harold, 1870; Aphodius metallicus Haldeman, 1848; Aphodius spretus Haldeman, 1848; Aphodius adelaidae Hope, 1846; Aphodius aterrimus Melsheimer, 1845; Aphodius memnonius Sturm, 1843; Aphodius granarius concolor Mulsant, 1842; Aphodius granarius cribratus Mulsant, 1842; Aphodius granarius moestus Mulsant, 1842; Aphodius granarius parcepunctatus Mulsant, 1842; Aphodius granarius rugosulus Mulsant, 1842; Aphodius suturalis Faldermann, 1836; Aphodius retusus Waltl, 1835; Aphodius elongatus Ménétriés, 1832; Aphodius emarginatus Stephens, 1830; Aphodius haemorrhous Stephens, 1830; Aphodius lucens Stephens, 1830; Aphodius melanopus Stephens, 1830; Aphodius carbonarius Sturm, 1805; Scarabaeus quadrituberculatus Fabricius, 1798; Scarabaeus haemorrhoidalis Degeer, 1774

= Calamosternus granarius =

Species of beetle

Calamosternus granarius is a species of dung beetle with a widespread distribution.

== Description ==
This species has an average length is about 4–6 mm (0.16–0.24 in). They have a subparallel-sided, shining, black to dark brown body, sometimes with the elytra lighter than the head and pronotum.

== Life history ==
They feed on debris, decaying vegetation, compost, carrion and on animal dung.

== Taxonomy ==
This species was formerly a member of the genus Aphodius.
