= Oxyomus cameratus =

Scientific classification
- Kingdom: Animalia
- Phylum: Arthropoda
- Clade: Pancrustacea
- Class: Insecta
- Order: Coleoptera
- Suborder: Polyphaga
- Infraorder: Scarabaeiformia
- Family: Scarabaeidae
- Genus: Oxyomus
- Species: O. cameratus

Binomial name
- Oxyomus cameratus Schmidt, 1908

Species of beetle

Oxyomus cameratus is a species of beetle of the family Scarabaeidae. It is found in India (Tamil Nadu).

== Description ==
Adults reach a length of about 3–3.2 mm (0.12–0.13 in). They are similar to Oxyomus simillimus, but somewhat more broadly oval. They are shiny and black, with the anterior margin of the head and the sides of the pronotum reddish-brown.
