= Oxyomus miliaris =

Scientific classification
- Kingdom: Animalia
- Phylum: Arthropoda
- Clade: Pancrustacea
- Class: Insecta
- Order: Coleoptera
- Suborder: Polyphaga
- Infraorder: Scarabaeiformia
- Family: Scarabaeidae
- Genus: Oxyomus
- Species: O. miliaris

Binomial name
- Oxyomus miliaris (Schmidt, 1908)

Synonyms
- Aphodius miliaris Schmidt, 1908; Aphodius (Amidorinus) rosti Koshantschikov, 1912

Species of beetle

Oxyomus miliaris is a species of beetle of the family Scarabaeidae. It is found in the Himalaya, Nepal and India (Himachal Pradesh).

== Description ==
Adults reach a length of about 2.5–3.2 mm (0.098–0.126 in). They have a moderately convex, dark reddish-brown body. The upper surface is dull.
