= Oxyomus debilis =

Scientific classification
- Kingdom: Animalia
- Phylum: Arthropoda
- Clade: Pancrustacea
- Class: Insecta
- Order: Coleoptera
- Suborder: Polyphaga
- Infraorder: Scarabaeiformia
- Family: Scarabaeidae
- Genus: Oxyomus
- Species: O. debilis

Binomial name
- Oxyomus debilis (Harold, 1877)

Synonyms
- Heptaulacus debilis Harold, 1877

Species of beetle

Oxyomus debilis is a species of beetle of the family Scarabaeidae. It is found in Indonesia (Sulawesi, Sumatra).

== Description ==
Adults reach a length of about 2.5–3 mm (0.098–0.118 in). They have a slightly convex, only slightly glossy body, which is covered with short hairs. The upper surface is chestnut-brown, while the underside is somewhat lighter brown.
