= Oxyomus arunae =

Scientific classification
- Kingdom: Animalia
- Phylum: Arthropoda
- Clade: Pancrustacea
- Class: Insecta
- Order: Coleoptera
- Suborder: Polyphaga
- Infraorder: Scarabaeiformia
- Family: Scarabaeidae
- Genus: Oxyomus
- Species: O. arunae

Binomial name
- Oxyomus arunae Stebnicka, 1985

Species of beetle

Oxyomus arunae is a species of beetle of the family Scarabaeidae. It is found in Nepal.

== Description ==
Adults reach a length of about 2.4–2.6 mm (0.094–0.102 in). They have an oblong-oval, convex, dull, brownish black body, with the anterior of the clypeus and the legs reddish-brown. The surface is partly covered by an argillaceous coating.
