= Oxyomus setosopunctatus =

Scientific classification
- Kingdom: Animalia
- Phylum: Arthropoda
- Clade: Pancrustacea
- Class: Insecta
- Order: Coleoptera
- Suborder: Polyphaga
- Infraorder: Scarabaeiformia
- Family: Scarabaeidae
- Genus: Oxyomus
- Species: O. setosopunctatus

Binomial name
- Oxyomus setosopunctatus Schmidt, 1911

Species of beetle

Oxyomus setosopunctatus is a species of beetle of the family Scarabaeidae. It is found in Mexico (Hidalgo, México, Michoacán, Oaxaca, Puebla, Veracruz).

== Description ==
Adults reach a length of about 2.5–3.5 mm (0.098–0.138 in). They have an oval-elongate, convex, dull, pubescent and blackish body, sometimes with the elytra dirty brownish.
