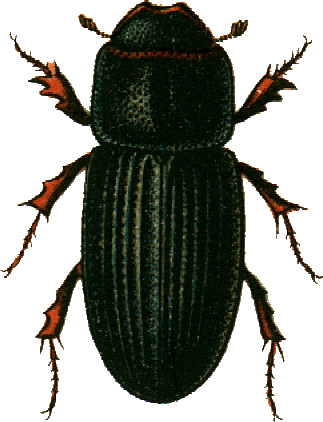

Scientific classification
- Kingdom: Animalia
- Phylum: Arthropoda
- Clade: Pancrustacea
- Class: Insecta
- Order: Coleoptera
- Suborder: Polyphaga
- Infraorder: Scarabaeiformia
- Family: Scarabaeidae
- Genus: Oxyomus
- Species: O. sylvestris

Binomial name
- Oxyomus sylvestris (Scopoli, 1763)

Synonyms
- Scarabaeus sylvestris Scopoli, 1763; Oxyomus opacifrons Horn, 1871; Oxyomus porcatus foveolatus Mulsant, 1842; Ips platycephalus Marsham, 1802; Scarabaeus foveolatus Moll, 1785; Scarabaeus fenestralis Schrank, 1781; Scarabaeus porcatus Fabricius, 1775

= Oxyomus sylvestris =

Species of beetle

Oxyomus sylvestris is a species of aphodiine dung beetle in the family Scarabaeidae. It occurs in Europe, the Near East, and North Africa. It is saprophagous rather than a "true" dung beetle.

== Distribution ==
Palaearctic: Albania, Armenia, Austria, Azerbaijan, Belarus, Belgium, Bosnia Herzegovina, Bulgaria, Croatia, Czech Republic, Denmark, Estonia, Finland, France, Georgia, Germany, Great Britain, Greece, Hungary, Iran, Israel, Italy, Latvia, Lithuania, Luxembourg, Macedonia, Montenegro, Netherlands, Poland, Portugal, Romania, Serbia, Slovakia, Slovenia, Spain, Sweden, Switzerland, Ukraine. Nearctic: Canada (British Columbia, Nova Scotia, Quebec, Saskatchewan), the United States: north-eastern United States, Pacific Northwest States.
