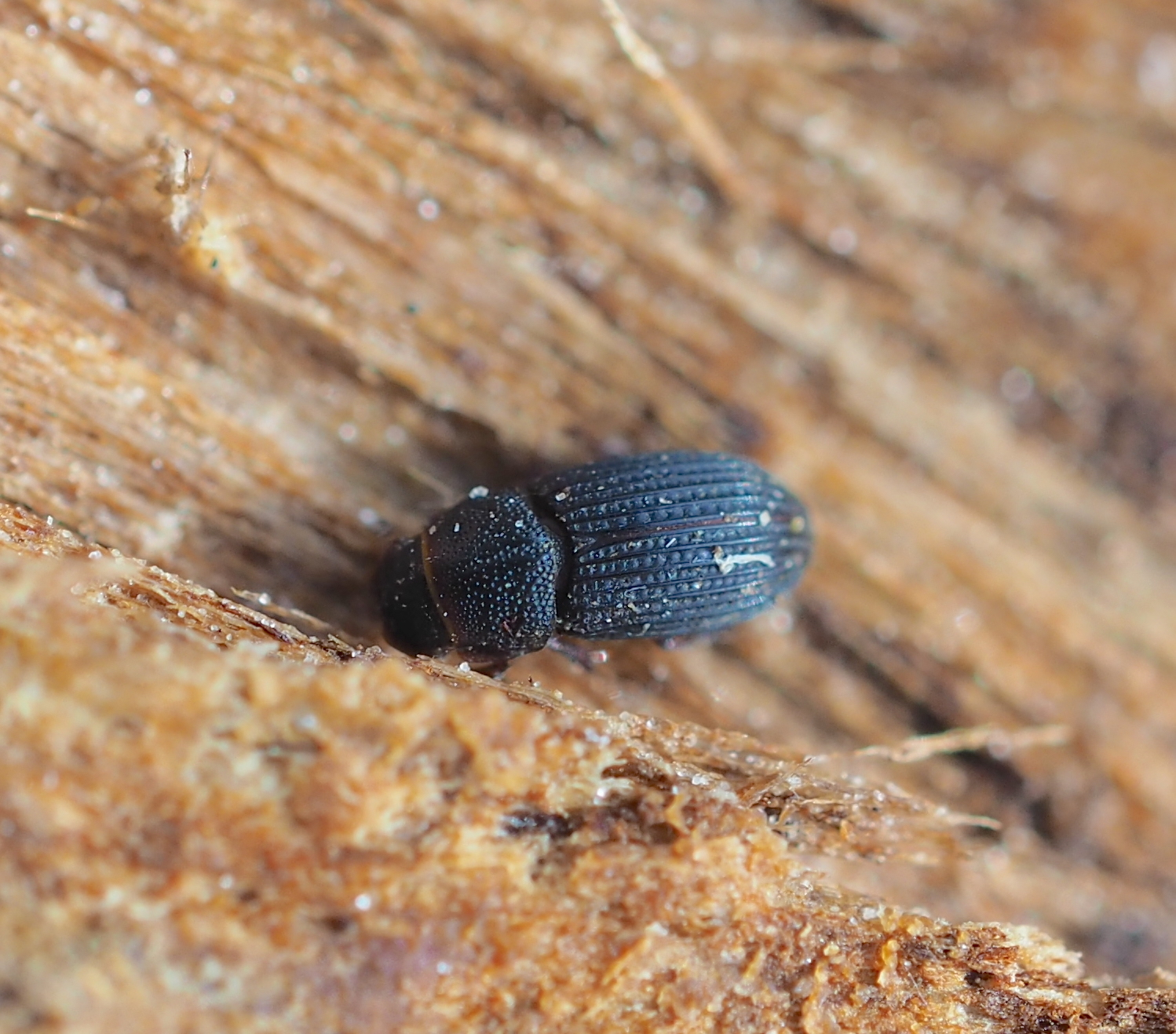
- Oxyomus sylvestris, Germany

Scientific classification
- Kingdom: Animalia
- Phylum: Arthropoda
- Clade: Pancrustacea
- Class: Insecta
- Order: Coleoptera
- Suborder: Polyphaga
- Infraorder: Scarabaeiformia
- Family: Scarabaeidae
- Tribe: Aphodiini
- Genus: Oxyomus; Dejean, 1833

Synonyms
- Aphodius (Amidorinus) Koshantschikov, 1912

= Oxyomus =

Genus of beetles

Oxyomus is a genus of aphodiine dung beetles in the family Scarabaeidae. There are about 25 described species in Oxyomus, found in Europe, Asia, Africa, and North America.

== Species ==
These 25 species belong to the genus Oxyomus:

- Oxyomus aciculatus Schmidt, 1909
- Oxyomus arunae Stebnicka, 1985
- Oxyomus bremeri Stebnicka, 1982
- Oxyomus cameratus Schmidt, 1908
- Oxyomus costulatus (Fairmaire, 1849)
- Oxyomus debilis (Harold, 1877)
- Oxyomus inaequalis Lansberge, 1886
- Oxyomus ishidai Nakane, 1977
- Oxyomus jucundulus (Péringuey, 1901)
- Oxyomus kiuchii Masumoto, 1991
- Oxyomus kocoti Minkina, 2018
- Oxyomus malgorzatae Minkina, 2016
- Oxyomus mariateresae Dellacasa, Dellacasa & Gordon, 2014
- Oxyomus masumotoi Nomura, 1973
- Oxyomus mencli Minkina, 2016
- Oxyomus miliaris (Schmidt, 1908)
- Oxyomus nanxiensis Masumoto, Kiuchi & Wang, 2018
- Oxyomus nowaki Minkina, 2016
- Oxyomus nubigenus Petrovitz, 1968
- Oxyomus setosopunctatus Schmidt, 1911
- Oxyomus simillimus Schmidt, 1908
- Oxyomus sylvestris (Scopoli, 1763)
- Oxyomus taipingensis Masumoto, Kiuchi & Wang, 2014
- Oxyomus thailandicus Masumoto, 1991
- † Oxyomus nearcticus Wickham, 1914
