= Oxyomus aciculatus =

Scientific classification
- Kingdom: Animalia
- Phylum: Arthropoda
- Clade: Pancrustacea
- Class: Insecta
- Order: Coleoptera
- Suborder: Polyphaga
- Infraorder: Scarabaeiformia
- Family: Scarabaeidae
- Genus: Oxyomus
- Species: O. aciculatus

Binomial name
- Oxyomus aciculatus Schmidt, 1909

Species of beetle

Oxyomus aciculatus is a species of beetle of the family Scarabaeidae. It is found in Myanmar and Thailand.

== Description ==
Adults reach a length of about 3.5 mm (0.14 in). They are dark reddish-brown, with the anterior margin of the head and the sides of the pronotum lighter brown. The dorsal surface is covered with short hairs giving it a dull appearance, leaving only the ridges of the elytra shiny. The legs are light brown.
