= Oxyomus simillimus =

Scientific classification
- Kingdom: Animalia
- Phylum: Arthropoda
- Clade: Pancrustacea
- Class: Insecta
- Order: Coleoptera
- Suborder: Polyphaga
- Infraorder: Scarabaeiformia
- Family: Scarabaeidae
- Genus: Oxyomus
- Species: O. simillimus

Binomial name
- Oxyomus simillimus Schmidt, 1908

Species of beetle

Oxyomus simillimus is a species of beetle of the family Scarabaeidae. It is found in India (Tamil Nadu).

== Description ==
Adults reach a length of about 3 mm (0.12 in). The head and pronotum are black, while the elytra are reddish-brown to blackish-brown.
