= Euheptaulacus sus =

Scientific classification
- Kingdom: Animalia
- Phylum: Arthropoda
- Clade: Pancrustacea
- Class: Insecta
- Order: Coleoptera
- Suborder: Polyphaga
- Infraorder: Scarabaeiformia
- Family: Scarabaeidae
- Genus: Euheptaulacus
- Species: E. sus

Binomial name
- Euheptaulacus sus (Herbst, 1783)

Synonyms
- Scarabaeus sus Herbst, 1783; Heptaulacus sus; Heptaulacus sus austerus Zirk, 1922; Heptaulacus sus interminis Zirk, 1922; Scarabaeus pubescens Olivier, 1789

Species of beetle

Euheptaulacus sus is a species of beetle of the family Scarabaeidae. It is found in Armenia, Austria, Belarus, Belgium, Bosnia Herzegovina, Bulgaria, the Czech Republic, Denmark, Estonia, Finland, France, Georgia, Germany, Great Britain, Greece, Hungary, Iran, Italy, Kazakhstan, Latvia, Lithuania, Macedonia, Moldova, the Netherlands, Poland, Romania, Russia, Serbia, Siberia, Slovakia, Slovenia, Spain, Switzerland, Sweden, Syria, Turkey, Turkmenistan and Ukraine.

== Description ==
Adults reach a length of about 4–5.2 mm (0.16–0.20 in). The head and pronotum are moderately shiny. The back of the head and the disc of the pronotum are dark reddish-brown to blackish-brown, while the front of the head and the lateral margins of the pronotum are yellowish-brown or light reddish-brown. The elytra are yellowish-brown, the intervals with black spots.
