= Euheptaulacus porcellus =

Scientific classification
- Kingdom: Animalia
- Phylum: Arthropoda
- Clade: Pancrustacea
- Class: Insecta
- Order: Coleoptera
- Suborder: Polyphaga
- Infraorder: Scarabaeiformia
- Family: Scarabaeidae
- Genus: Euheptaulacus
- Species: E. porcellus

Binomial name
- Euheptaulacus porcellus (Frivaldszky, 1879)

Synonyms
- Oxyomus porcellus Frivaldszky, 1879

Species of beetle

Euheptaulacus porcellus is a species of beetle of the family Scarabaeidae. It is found in Austria, Bosnia Herzegovina, the Czech Republic, Slovakia, Hungary and Italy.

== Description ==
Adults reach a length of about 3.8–5 mm (0.15–0.20 in). They have an elongate, slightly convex, glossy body. The head and pronotum are brown, the former bordered with yellow at the front and sides, while the latter has a yellow margin along its sides. The elytra are light yellowish-brown or reddish-yellow, sometimes with faint, darker spots. The legs are yellowish-brown.
