= Euheptaulacus =

Scientific classification
- Kingdom: Animalia
- Phylum: Arthropoda
- Clade: Pancrustacea
- Class: Insecta
- Order: Coleoptera
- Suborder: Polyphaga
- Infraorder: Scarabaeiformia
- Family: Scarabaeidae
- Subfamily: Aphodiinae
- Tribe: Aphodiini
- Genus: Euheptaulacus; Dellacasa, 1983

Genus of beetles

Euheptaulacus is a genus of beetles of the family Scarabaeidae.

== Species ==
- Euheptaulacus atlantis (Peyerimhoff, 1925)
- Euheptaulacus carinatus (Germar, 1823)
- Euheptaulacus nemethi (Théry, 1925)
- Euheptaulacus porcellus (Frivaldszky, 1879)
- Euheptaulacus sus (Herbst, 1783)
- Euheptaulacus villosus (Gyllenhal, 1806)
