= Euheptaulacus villosus =

Scientific classification
- Kingdom: Animalia
- Phylum: Arthropoda
- Clade: Pancrustacea
- Class: Insecta
- Order: Coleoptera
- Suborder: Polyphaga
- Infraorder: Scarabaeiformia
- Family: Scarabaeidae
- Genus: Euheptaulacus
- Species: E. villosus

Binomial name
- Euheptaulacus villosus (Gyllenhal, 1806)

Synonyms
- Aphodius villosus Gyllenhal, 1806

Species of beetle

Euheptaulacus villosus is a species of beetle of the family Scarabaeidae. It is found in Austria, Belgium, Bosnia Herzegovina, Croatia, the Czech Republic, Denmark, Estonia, Finland, France, Georgia, Germany, Great Britain, Hungary, Italy, Kazakhstan, Latvia, the Netherlands, Norway, Poland, Romania, Slovakia, Slovenia, Sweden and Ukraine.

== Description ==
Adults reach a length of about 3.5–4.5 mm (0.14–0.18 in). They have a moderately convex, glossy, light reddish-yellow-brown or light reddish-brown body, with the rear of the head and the disc of the pronotum darker. The legs are yellow-brown.
