= Euheptaulacus atlantis =

Scientific classification
- Kingdom: Animalia
- Phylum: Arthropoda
- Clade: Pancrustacea
- Class: Insecta
- Order: Coleoptera
- Suborder: Polyphaga
- Infraorder: Scarabaeiformia
- Family: Scarabaeidae
- Genus: Euheptaulacus
- Species: E. atlantis

Binomial name
- Euheptaulacus atlantis (Peyerimhoff, 1925)

Synonyms
- Heptaulacus atlantis Peyerimhoff, 1925; Heptaulacus peyerimhoffi Paulian & Villiers, 1939

Species of beetle

Euheptaulacus atlantis is a species of beetle of the family Scarabaeidae. It is found in Morocco.

== Description ==
Adults reach a length of about 5–6 mm (0.20–0.24 in). They have an elongate, slightly convex, glossy body. The head and pronotum are black to blackish-brown, while the elytra are either lighter or darker yellowish-brown, with elongate black spots. The legs are brown.
