= Euheptaulacus carinatus =

Scientific classification
- Kingdom: Animalia
- Phylum: Arthropoda
- Clade: Pancrustacea
- Class: Insecta
- Order: Coleoptera
- Suborder: Polyphaga
- Infraorder: Scarabaeiformia
- Family: Scarabaeidae
- Genus: Euheptaulacus
- Species: E. carinatus

Binomial name
- Euheptaulacus carinatus (Germar, 1823)

Synonyms
- Aphodius carinatus Germar, 1823; Heptaulacus alpinus brutius Luigioni, 1920; Euheptaulacus carinatus stramineipennis Dellacasa & Dellacasa, 2000; Heptaulacus obenbergeri Balthasar, 1951; Heptaulacus nivalis Mulsant, 1842; Aphodius alpinus Drapiez, 1819

Species of beetle

Euheptaulacus carinatus is a species of beetle of the family Scarabaeidae. It is found in Armenia, Austria, Belarus, Belgium, Bosnia and Herzegovina, Bulgaria, the Czech Republic, Denmark, Estonia, France, Georgia, Germany, Great Britain, Greece, Hungary, Iran, Italy, Kazakhstan, Latvia, Lithuania, Luxembourg, Netherlands, Poland, Romania, Russia, Slovakia, Spain, Sweden, Switzerland, Syria, Turkmenistan, Ukraine and China (Xinjiang).

== Description ==
Adults reach a length of about 4–6 mm (0.16–0.24 in). They have an elongate, moderately convex, feebly shiny, pubescent body. The head and pronotum are blackish, with the sides reddish. The elytra are dirty yellowish with the sutural margin and numerous blackish spots.

== Subspecies ==
- Euheptaulacus carinatus carinatus (Armenia, Austria, Belarus, Belgium, Bosnia and Herzegovina, Bulgaria, the Czech Republic, Denmark, Estonia, France, Georgia, Germany, Great Britain, Greece, Hungary, Iran, Italy, Kazakhstan, Latvia, Lithuania, Luxembourg, Netherlands, Poland, Romania, Russia, Russia Far East, Siberia, Slovakia, Spain, Sweden, Switzerland, Syria, Turkmenistan, Ukraine, China: Xinjiang)
- Euheptaulacus carinatus brutius (Luigioni, 1920) (Italy: Appennino Centrale)
- Euheptaulacus carinatus esuriens Dellacasa, 1983 (Italy: Sicily)
