= Euheptaulacus nemethi =

Scientific classification
- Kingdom: Animalia
- Phylum: Arthropoda
- Clade: Pancrustacea
- Class: Insecta
- Order: Coleoptera
- Suborder: Polyphaga
- Infraorder: Scarabaeiformia
- Family: Scarabaeidae
- Genus: Euheptaulacus
- Species: E. nemethi

Binomial name
- Euheptaulacus nemethi (Théry, 1925)

Synonyms
- Heptaulacus nemethi Théry, 1925

Species of beetle

Euheptaulacus nemethi is a species of beetle of the family Scarabaeidae. It is found in Morocco.

== Description ==
Adults reach a length of about 4.2–4.6 mm (0.17–0.18 in). They have a fairly parallel-sided, slightly convex body, with the head and pronotum very shiny and black. The latter has a light-colored margin along the sides. The elytra are yellowish-brown, with blackish longitudinal spots and the legs are yellowish-brown.
