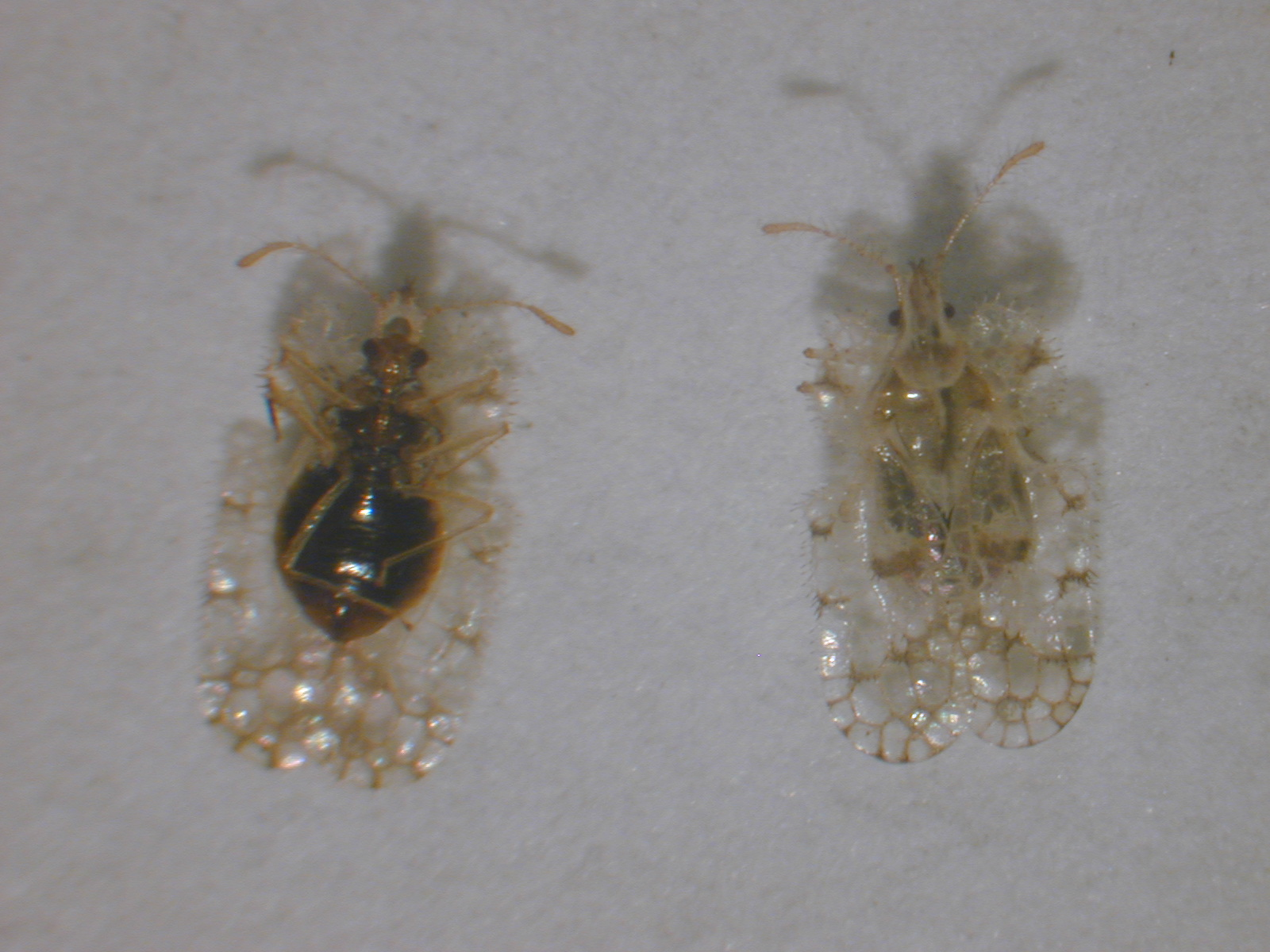

Scientific classification
- Kingdom: Animalia
- Phylum: Arthropoda
- Clade: Pancrustacea
- Class: Insecta
- Order: Hemiptera
- Suborder: Heteroptera
- Family: Tingidae
- Genus: Corythucha
- Species: C. gossypii

Binomial name
- Corythucha gossypii (Fabricius, 1794)

= Corythucha gossypii =

Species of true bug

Corythucha gossypii, the cotton lace bug or bean lace bug, is a species of lace bug in the family Tingidae that is associated with cotton and a number of other host plants.

== Description ==
The adult Corythucha gossypi is white and lacks the brown at the base of the elytra (wing-cases) had by some other species. The crest on the hood measures less than one and a half times as high as the median carina (ridge on the body-wall), which distinguishes this species from C. morrilli, C. marmorata and C. cydoniae.

== Hosts ==
Corythucha gossypii is a common pest of cotton, but has also been reported from the castor-oil plant (Ricinus communis) and another twenty three species of plant hosts.

== Ecology ==
Corythucha gossypii is found on the underside of the leaves of the host. The more adults and nymphs that are present, the more badly affected the leaf is, and the earlier it is shed. The upper surface of the leaf is pale and looks bleached, while the underside, where the insects are feeding, is dotted with mounds of brown faecal matter. This insect is not normally a serious pest, though it may be worse under dry conditions. Various natural enemies keep it under control; these include parasitoid wasps, assassin bugs, the larvae of lacewings, ladybirds and pirate bugs.
