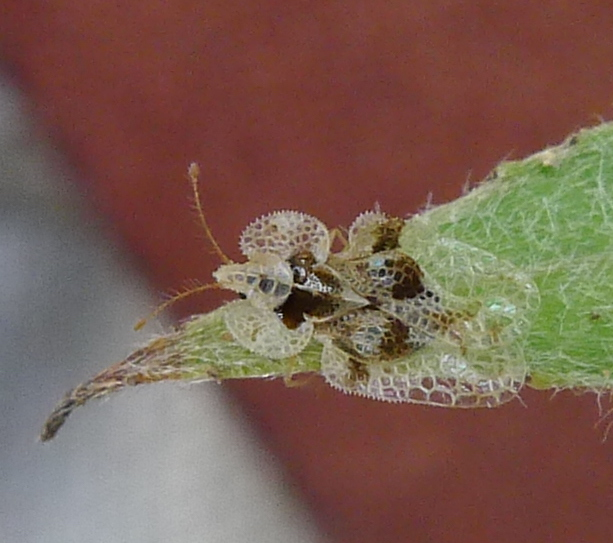

Scientific classification
- Kingdom: Animalia
- Phylum: Arthropoda
- Clade: Pancrustacea
- Class: Insecta
- Order: Hemiptera
- Suborder: Heteroptera
- Family: Tingidae
- Genus: Corythucha
- Species: C. ciliata

Binomial name
- Corythucha ciliata (Say, 1832)

Synonyms
- Tingis ciliata Say, 1832

= Corythucha ciliata =

Species of true bug

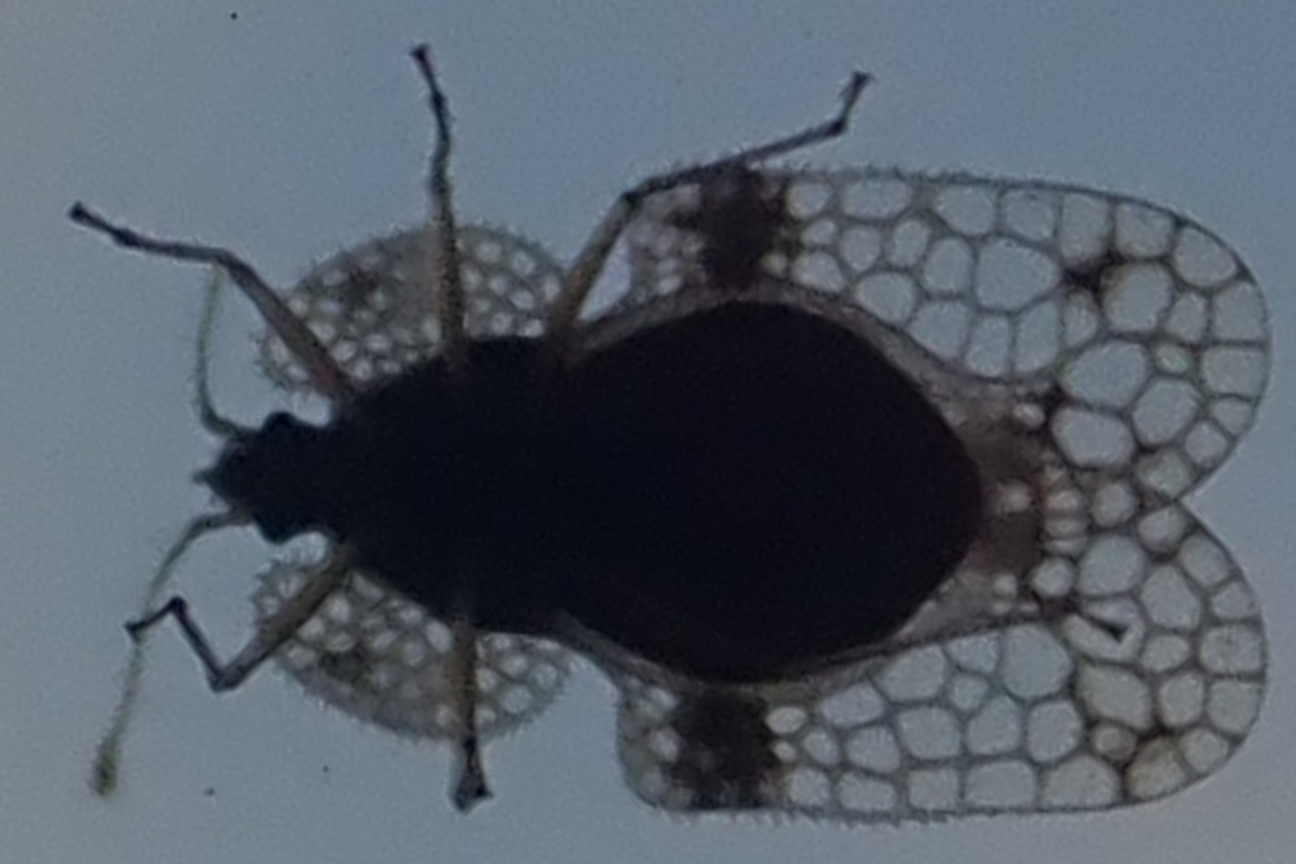
Bottom (ventral) view

Corythucha ciliata, the sycamore lace bug, is a species of lace bug in the family Tingidae that is associated with sycamore trees. It's also known as the plane lace bug due to its association with the London plane (Platanus × hispanica).

It originates in the New World, but has been introduced and has spread in Europe. It is a small, whitish insect and feeds on the underside of the leaves, sucking sap.

There are reports in Europe of C. cilata landing on people and biting them. Reports from Italy, France and Romania indicate that some people experience adverse reactions, e.g., dermatosis.

== Description ==
The adult sycamore lace bug is milky white in colour and between 3.2 and 3.7 mm (0.13 and 0.15 in) in length. It is similar in appearance to the cotton lace bug (Corythucha gossypii) and the Florida oak lace bug (Corythucha floridana), but lacks the brown crescent-shaped band on the carina (ridge on the body-wall) of the former and is larger than the latter. The only brown colour is a small spot on the protuberance on each elytron (wing-case). The nymphs are oval in shape, dorso-ventrally flattened, black and prickly. This lace bug can most easily be distinguished from other species by its presence on sycamore.

== Distribution and hosts ==
Corythucha ciliata is native to North America and is found where its host trees grow. The main host is the American sycamore (Platanus occidentalis) but it is sometimes found on other species of Platanus, and it has been recorded on Broussonetia papyrifera, Carya ovata, Chamaedaphne sp., Fraxinus sp., Quercus laurifolia and Liquidambar styraciflua.

In Europe the sycamore lacebug was first observed in 1964 in Padova, Italy, and has since spread throughout Southern and Central Europe with populations are far east as Uzbekistan, infesting the London plane (Platanus × hispanica). Although it does not by itself kill trees, in Central Europe it is often found in association with two plant-pathogenic fungi which can kill trees, Apiognomonia veneta and Ceratocystis fimbriata, leading to the hypothesis that it may act as a vector for these fungi.

Feeding causes leaves to show chlorotic stippling (light coloured marks from lack of chlorophyll) near leaf veins which can spread across the entire leaf causing them to lighten or bronze, ultimately leading to premature falling. The effects of this are most notable in late summer.

=== Britain and Ireland ===
Whilst widespread in mainland Europe, it's not considered endemic to the United Kingdom. In 2006, outbreaks were discovered by agents from the Plant Health and Seeds Inspectorate (PHSI) at two nurseries in Bedfordshire along with a stand of plane trees nearby. The insects were found to have infected both London and Oriental plane trees imported from France and Italy, as well as mature plane trees on the site. It was assumed the species was established however no further sightings were reported until 2023.

== Life cycle ==
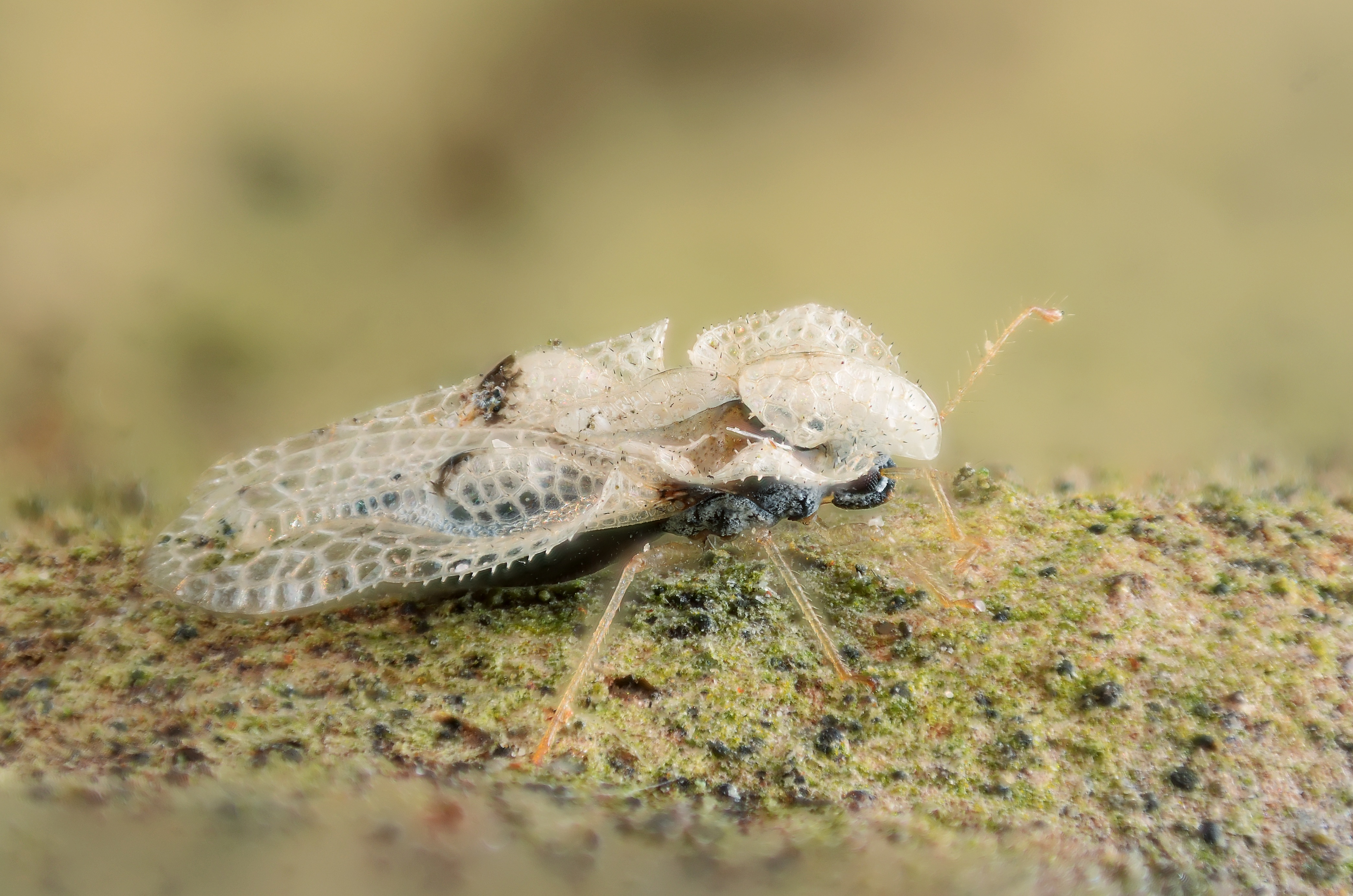
Lateral view

After the adults have mated, the female lays eggs on the undersides of leaves of the host tree, usually near a fork in the veins. When the eggs hatch, the juveniles stay close together at first, only moving onto a new leaf at the fourth instar stage. They puncture the epidermis of the leaf with their mouth parts and suck sap. There are five instars, after which the nymphs undergo incomplete metamorphosis to become adults. During the summer in Oklahoma, the whole cycle takes about 44 days. In the warmer parts of the insect's range, between 19 °C (66 °F) and 33 °C (91 °F) being considered ideal, there may be several generations (1–3) each year. The insects are restricted to the underside of the leaves where little black mounds of dried frass can be seen and the shed skins of the nymphs often adhere to the leaf. The upper surface of the leaf is speckled with white, near the veins at first, and the leaf becomes progressively paler or bronzed and may fall early. Overwintering generally takes place as adults in crevices or under flakes of bark, the insects being able to withstand temperatures down to at least −24 °C (−11 °F).

== Bibliography ==
- Malumphy, Chris; Reid, Sharon; Eyre, Dominic; Lindley-Klassen, Dani (18 October 2023). DEFRA (ed.). Plant Pest Factsheet: Plane Lace Bug (corythucha ciliata) (PDF) (2023 ed.). York: UK Plant Health Information Portal (DEFRA). Archived from the original (PDF) on 8 September 2024.
- Lindley-Klassen, Dani (13 July 2023). Pest Alert: Plane lace bug (Corythucha ciliata) (PDF). York: UK Plant Health Information Portal (DEFRA). Archived from the original (PDF) on 8 September 2024.
