= Corythucha tuthilli =

Scientific classification
- Kingdom: Animalia
- Phylum: Arthropoda
- Clade: Pancrustacea
- Class: Insecta
- Order: Hemiptera
- Suborder: Heteroptera
- Family: Tingidae
- Genus: Corythucha
- Species: C. tuthilli

Binomial name
- Corythucha tuthilli Drake, 1940

Species of true bug

Corythucha tuthilli is a little-known species of lace bug Tingidae native to Colorado and Arizona.

Corythucha tuthilli was first described from Mineral County, Colorado in the southern Rocky Mountains. It was recently found again on woolly cinquefoil (Potentilla hippiana Lehm.; Rosaceae.
