= Corythucha elegans =

Scientific classification
- Kingdom: Animalia
- Phylum: Arthropoda
- Clade: Pancrustacea
- Class: Insecta
- Order: Hemiptera
- Suborder: Heteroptera
- Family: Tingidae
- Genus: Corythucha
- Species: C. elegans

Binomial name
- Corythucha elegans Drake, 1918

Species of true bug

Corythucha elegans, the willow lace bug, is a bug species in the family Tingidae found on willows in North America.
