= Corythucha distincta =

Scientific classification
- Kingdom: Animalia
- Phylum: Arthropoda
- Clade: Pancrustacea
- Class: Insecta
- Order: Hemiptera
- Suborder: Heteroptera
- Family: Tingidae
- Tribe: Tingini
- Genus: Corythucha
- Species: C. distincta

Binomial name
- Corythucha distincta Osborn & Drake, 1916

Species of true bug

Corythucha distincta is a species of lace bug in the family Tingidae. It is found in North America.

== Subspecies ==
These two subspecies belong to the species Corythucha distincta:

- Corythucha distincta distincta Osborn & Drake, 1916
- Corythucha distincta spinata Osborn & Drake, 1917
