= Corythucha arcuata =

Scientific classification
- Kingdom: Animalia
- Phylum: Arthropoda
- Clade: Pancrustacea
- Class: Insecta
- Order: Hemiptera
- Suborder: Heteroptera
- Family: Tingidae
- Genus: Corythucha
- Species: C. arcuata

Binomial name
- Corythucha arcuata (Say, 1832)

Species of true bug

Corythucha arcuata, the oak lace bug, is a species of Tingidae that is a pest of oaks. It is native to the New World, and was first observed in Europe in 2000.

== Life cycle ==
It overwinters as an adult and has multiple generations per year that overlap. In the Mid-Atlantic region of the United States, there are three generations and the average first appearance of adults is after 159 growing degree-days and the first generation of eggs hatch after an average of 378 growing degree-days.

== Pest status ==
A decade after its introduction to Europe, it began to spread rapidly, and has now become a major invasive pest in over 20 EU countries, where it forms large infestations on several oak species, and often does considerable damage, such that negative long-term effects on oak health and survival are expected. As of 2023, prospects for control of this invasive pest were considered poor, with projections that a continual spread across Europe is inevitable unless control can be achieved. While there is at least one potential biological control agent known from its native range in the United States (an egg parasitoid mymarid wasp), there are no known predators or parasites in Europe.
