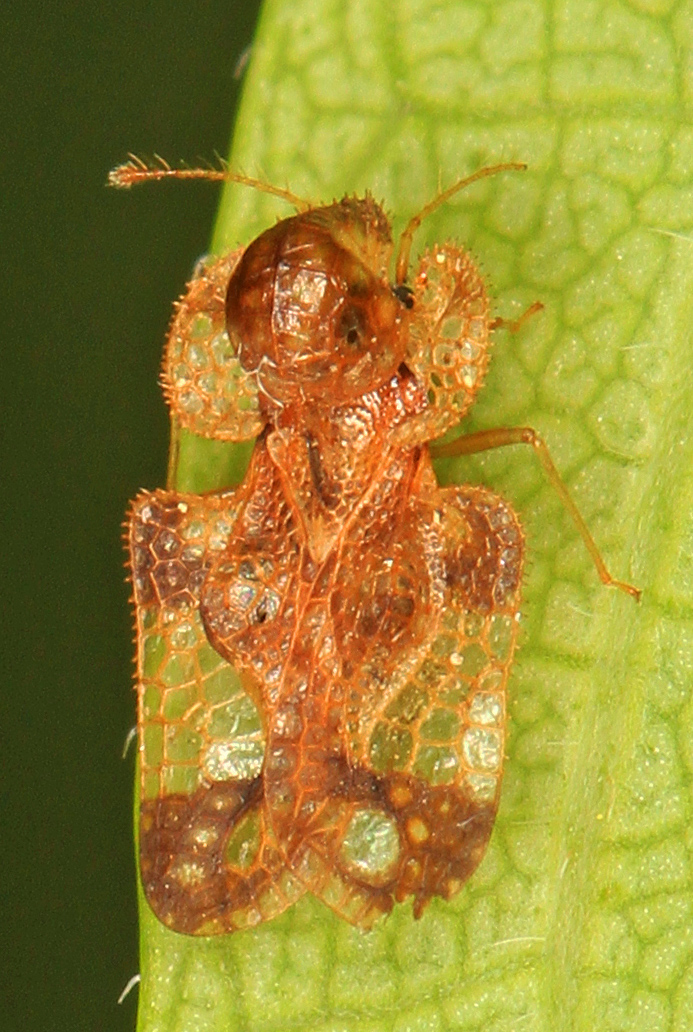

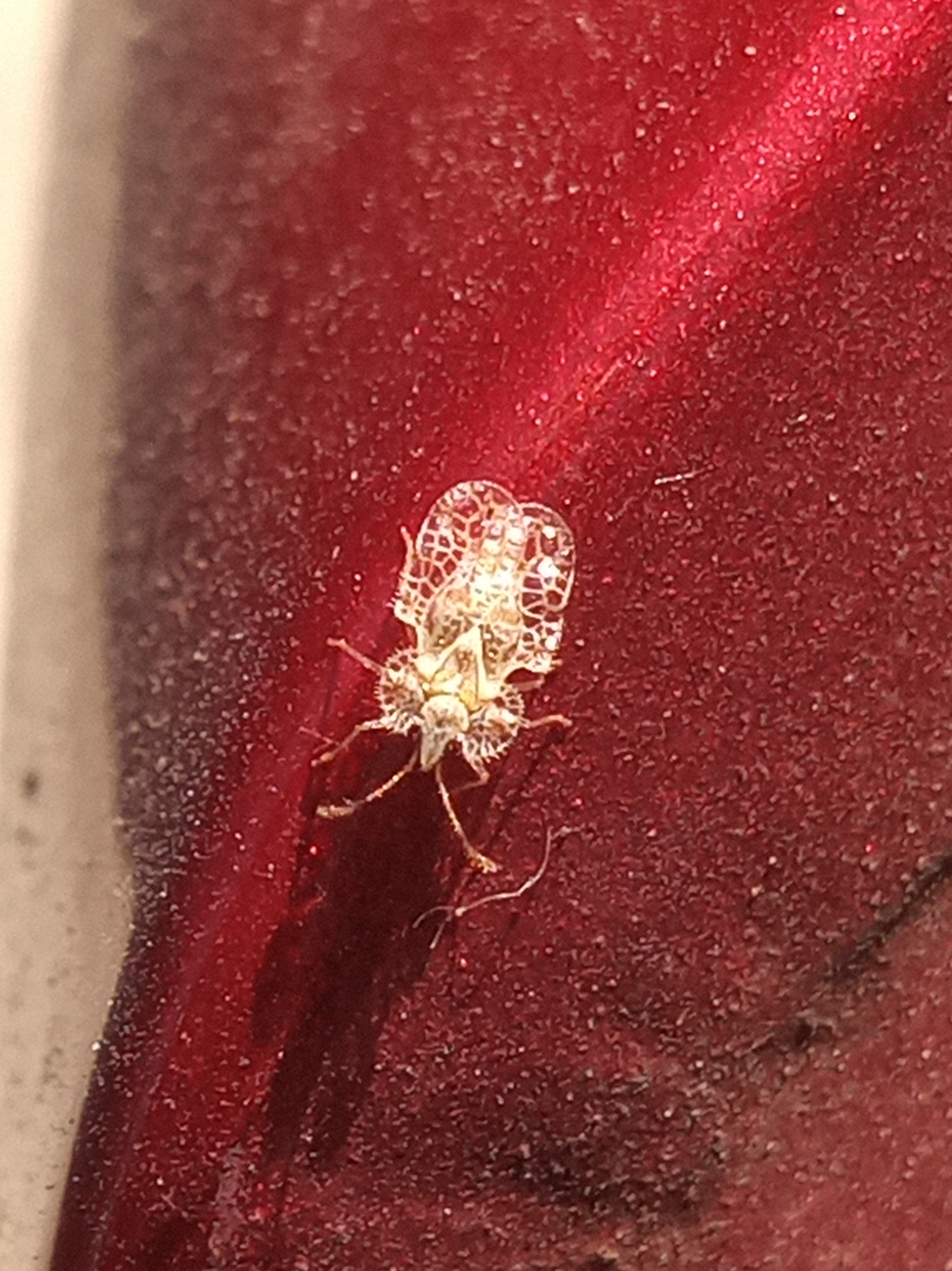
- Chrysanthemum lace bug, Corythucha marmorata

Scientific classification
- Domain: Eukaryota
- Kingdom: Animalia
- Phylum: Arthropoda
- Class: Insecta
- Order: Hemiptera
- Suborder: Heteroptera
- Family: Tingidae
- Tribe: Tingini
- Genus: Corythucha; Stal, 1873

= Corythucha =

Genus of true bugs

Corythucha is a large genus of lace bug in the family Tingidae that is primarily distributed in the northern hemisphere, including Europe, North America and eastern Asia. The genus includes pest species such as the “cotton or bean lace bug" (C. gossypii) as well as species that provide maternal care, such as C. hewitti (Drake)

== Species ==
These 75 species belong to the genus Corythucha:

- Corythucha abdita Drake, 1948^{i c g}
- Corythucha acculta Drake and Poor, 1942^{i c g}
- Corythucha aesculi Osborn & Drake, 1916^{i c g b} (buckeye lace bug)
- Corythucha agalma Drake and Cobben, 1960^{i c g}
- Corythucha arcuata (Say, 1832)^{i c g b} (oak lace bug)
- Corythucha argentinensis Monte, 1940^{i c g}
- Corythucha associata Osborn & Drake, 1916^{i c g b} (cherry lace bug)
- Corythucha baccharidis Drake, 1922^{i c g}
- Corythucha bellula Gibson, 1918^{i c g b}
- Corythucha boliviana Monte, 1946^{i c g}
- Corythucha bonaerensis Montemayor, 2009^{i g}
- Corythucha brunnea Gibson, 1918^{i c g}
- Corythucha bulbosa Osborn and Drake, 1916^{i c g}
- Corythucha caelata Uhler, 1894^{i c g}
- Corythucha caryae Bailey, 1951^{i c g}
- Corythucha celtidis Osborn & Drake, 1916^{i c g b} (hackberry lace bug)
- Corythucha cerasi Drake, 1948^{i c g b}
- Corythucha championi Drake and Cobben, 1960^{i c g}
- Corythucha ciliata (Say, 1832)^{i c g b} (sycamore lace bug)
- Corythucha clara Drake and Hambleton, 1938^{i c g}
- Corythucha confraterna Gibson, 1918^{i c g b}
- Corythucha coryli Osborn & Drake, 1917^{i c g b} (hazelnut lace bug)
- Corythucha cydoniae (Fitch, 1861)^{i c g b} (hawthorn lace bug)
- Corythucha decepta Drake, 1932^{i c g}
- Corythucha distincta Osborn & Drake, 1916^{i c g b}
- Corythucha elegans Drake, 1918^{i c g b} (willow lace bug)
- Corythucha eriodictyonae Osborn & Drake, 1917^{i c g b}
- Corythucha floridana Heidemann, 1909^{i c g}
- Corythucha fuscigera (Stål, 1862)^{i c g}
- Corythucha fuscomaculata (Stål, 1858)^{i g}
- Corythucha fuscomoculata (Stal, 1858)^{c g}
- Corythucha globigera Breddin, 1901^{i c g}
- Corythucha gossypii (Fabricius, 1794)^{i c g}
- Corythucha heidemanni Drake, 1918^{i c g b} (alder lace bug)
- Corythucha hewitti Drake, 1919^{i c g}
- Corythucha hispida Uhler, 1894^{i c g b}
- Corythucha immaculata Osborn & Drake, 1916^{i c g b}
- Corythucha incurvata Uhler, 1894^{i c g b}
- Corythucha juglandis (Fitch, 1857)^{i c g b} (walnut lace bug)
- Corythucha lowryi Drake, 1948^{i c g}
- Corythucha marmorata (Uhler, 1878)^{i c g b} (chrysanthemum lace bug)
- Corythucha mcelfreshi Drake, 1921^{i c g}
- Corythucha melissae Froeschner & Torres Miller, 2002^{i g b}
- Corythucha mollicula Osborn & Drake, 1916^{i c g b}
- Corythucha montivaga Drake, 1919^{i c g b}
- Corythucha morrilli Osborn & Drake, 1917^{i c g b} (morrill lace bug)
- Corythucha nicholi Drake, 1928^{i c g}
- Corythucha nobilis Drake and Bondar, 1932^{i c g}
- Corythucha nocens Drake & Hambleton, 1942^{c g}
- Corythucha nocentis Drake and Hambleton, 1942^{i g}
- Corythucha obliqua Osborn & Drake, 1916^{i c g b}
- Corythucha omani Drake, 1941^{i c g}
- Corythucha padi Drake, 1917^{i c g}
- Corythucha pallida Osborn & Drake, 1916^{i c g b}
- Corythucha pallipes Parshley, 1918^{i c g b} (birch lace bug)
- Corythucha palmatis Drake, 1929^{i c g}
- Corythucha pellucida Drake and Hambleton, 1938^{i c g}
- Corythucha pergandei Heidemann, 1906^{i c g b} (alder lace bug)
- Corythucha pruni Osborn & Drake, 1916^{i c g b}
- Corythucha rolstoni Ajmat, 1991^{i c g}
- Corythucha sagillata Drake, 1932^{i c g}
- Corythucha salicata Gibson, 1918^{i c g b}
- Corythucha scitula Drake, 1948^{i c g}
- Corythucha seguyi Drake, 1921^{i c g}
- Corythucha serta Drake and Hambleton, 1945^{i c g}
- Corythucha setosa Champion, 1897^{i c g}
- Corythucha socia Monte, 1940^{i c g}
- Corythucha sphaeraceae Drake, 1920^{c g}
- Corythucha sphaeralceae Drake, 1920^{i g}
- Corythucha spinosa (Dugès, 1889)^{i c g b}
- Corythucha tapiensis Ajmat, 1991^{i c g}
- Corythucha translucida Monte, 1946^{i c g}
- Corythucha tuthilli Drake, 1940^{i c g}
- Corythucha ulmi Osborn & Drake, 1916^{i c g b} (elm lace bug)
- Corythucha unifasciata Champion, 1897^{i c g}

Data sources: i = ITIS, c = Catalogue of Life, g = GBIF, b = Bugguide.net
