= Dictyla ehrethiae =

Scientific classification
- Domain: Eukaryota
- Kingdom: Animalia
- Phylum: Arthropoda
- Class: Insecta
- Order: Hemiptera
- Suborder: Heteroptera
- Family: Tingidae
- Genus: Dictyla
- Species: D. ehrethiae

Binomial name
- Dictyla ehrethiae (Gibson in Drake, 1917)

Synonyms
- Monanthia ehrethiae Gibson in Drake, 1917

Species of insect

Dictyla ehrethiae, the anacua lace bug, is a species of lace bug in the family Tingidae. It is found in Central America and North America.
