= Corythucha ulmi =

Scientific classification
- Kingdom: Animalia
- Phylum: Arthropoda
- Clade: Pancrustacea
- Class: Insecta
- Order: Hemiptera
- Suborder: Heteroptera
- Family: Tingidae
- Tribe: Tingini
- Genus: Corythucha
- Species: C. ulmi

Binomial name
- Corythucha ulmi Osborn & Drake, 1916

Synonyms
- Corythucha pallida ulmi Osborn and Drake, 1916

Species of true bug

Corythucha ulmi, the elm lace bug, is a species of lace bug in the family Tingidae. It is found in North America.
