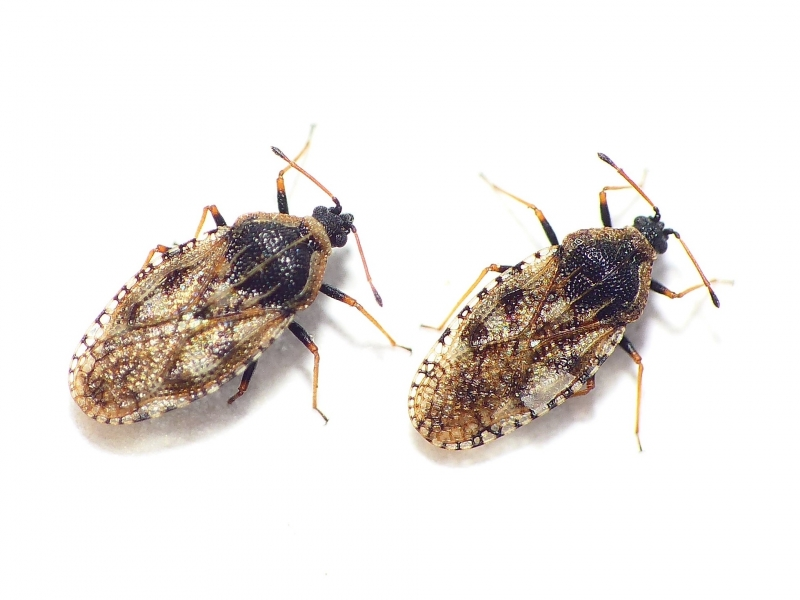

Scientific classification
- Kingdom: Animalia
- Phylum: Arthropoda
- Clade: Pancrustacea
- Class: Insecta
- Order: Hemiptera
- Suborder: Heteroptera
- Family: Tingidae
- Genus: Dictyla
- Species: D. echii

Binomial name
- Dictyla echii (Schrank, 1782)

Synonyms
- Cimex echii Schrank, 1782

= Dictyla echii =

Species of true bug

Dictyla echii is a species of lace bug in the family Tingidae. It is found in Africa, Europe and Northern Asia (excluding China), North America, and Southern Asia.

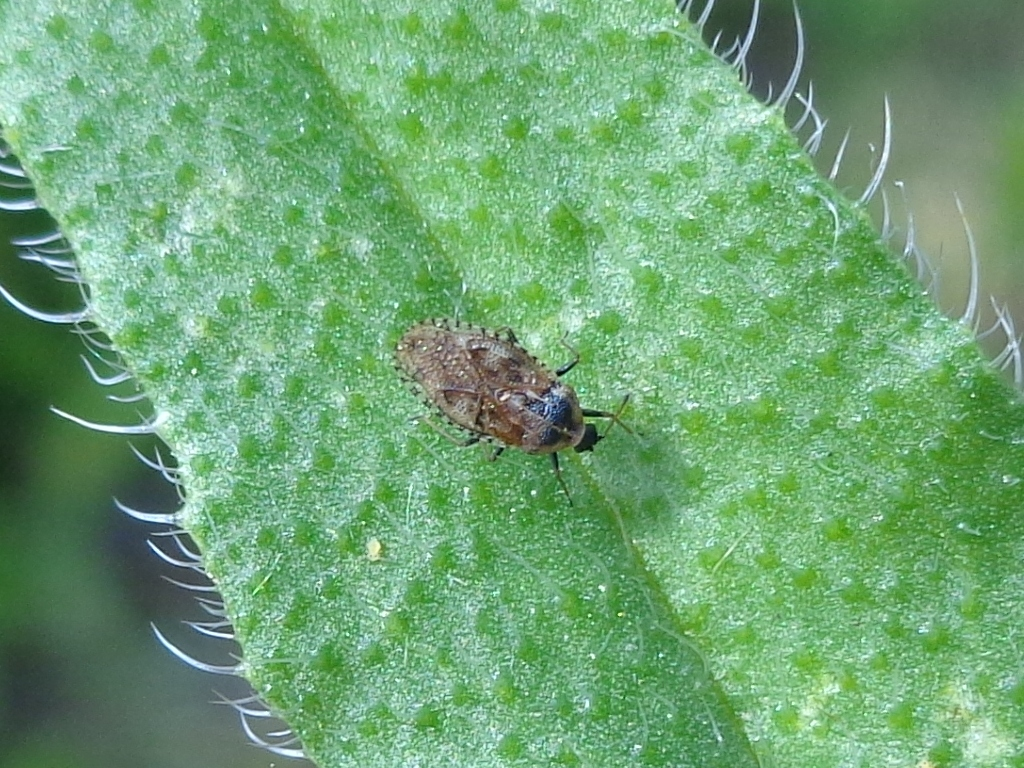

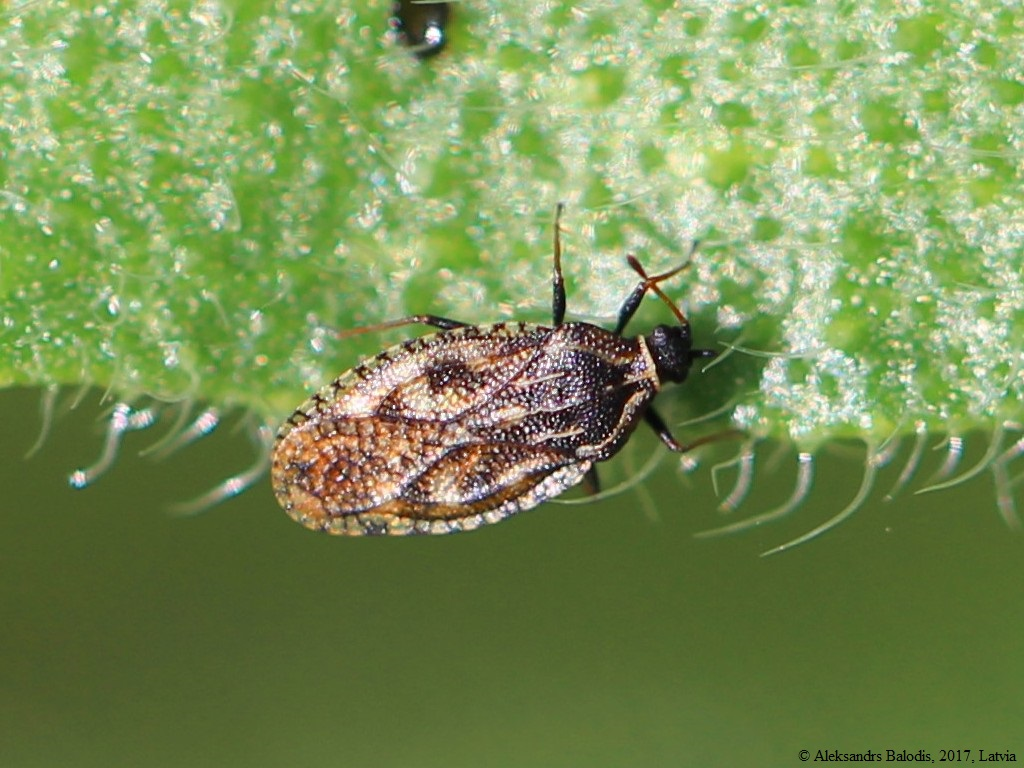

== Subspecies ==
These three subspecies belong to the species Dictyla echii:

- Dictyla echii echii (Schrank, 1782)^{i g}
- Dictyla echii nigricans (Hoberlandt, 1943)^{i c g}
- Dictyla echii rufina (Seidenstücker, 1954)^{i c g}

Data sources: i = ITIS, c = Catalogue of Life, g = GBIF, b = Bugguide.net
