= Corythucha spinosa =

Scientific classification
- Kingdom: Animalia
- Phylum: Arthropoda
- Clade: Pancrustacea
- Class: Insecta
- Order: Hemiptera
- Suborder: Heteroptera
- Family: Tingidae
- Tribe: Tingini
- Genus: Corythucha
- Species: C. spinosa

Binomial name
- Corythucha spinosa (Dugès, 1889)

Synonyms
- Tingis spinosa Dugès, 1889

Species of true bug

Corythucha spinosa is a species of lace bug in the family Tingidae. It is found in the Caribbean, Central America, and North America.
