= Corythucha immaculata =

Scientific classification
- Kingdom: Animalia
- Phylum: Arthropoda
- Clade: Pancrustacea
- Class: Insecta
- Order: Hemiptera
- Suborder: Heteroptera
- Family: Tingidae
- Tribe: Tingini
- Genus: Corythucha
- Species: C. immaculata

Binomial name
- Corythucha immaculata Osborn & Drake, 1916

Species of true bug

Corythucha immaculata is a species of lace bug in the family Tingidae. It is found in North America.
