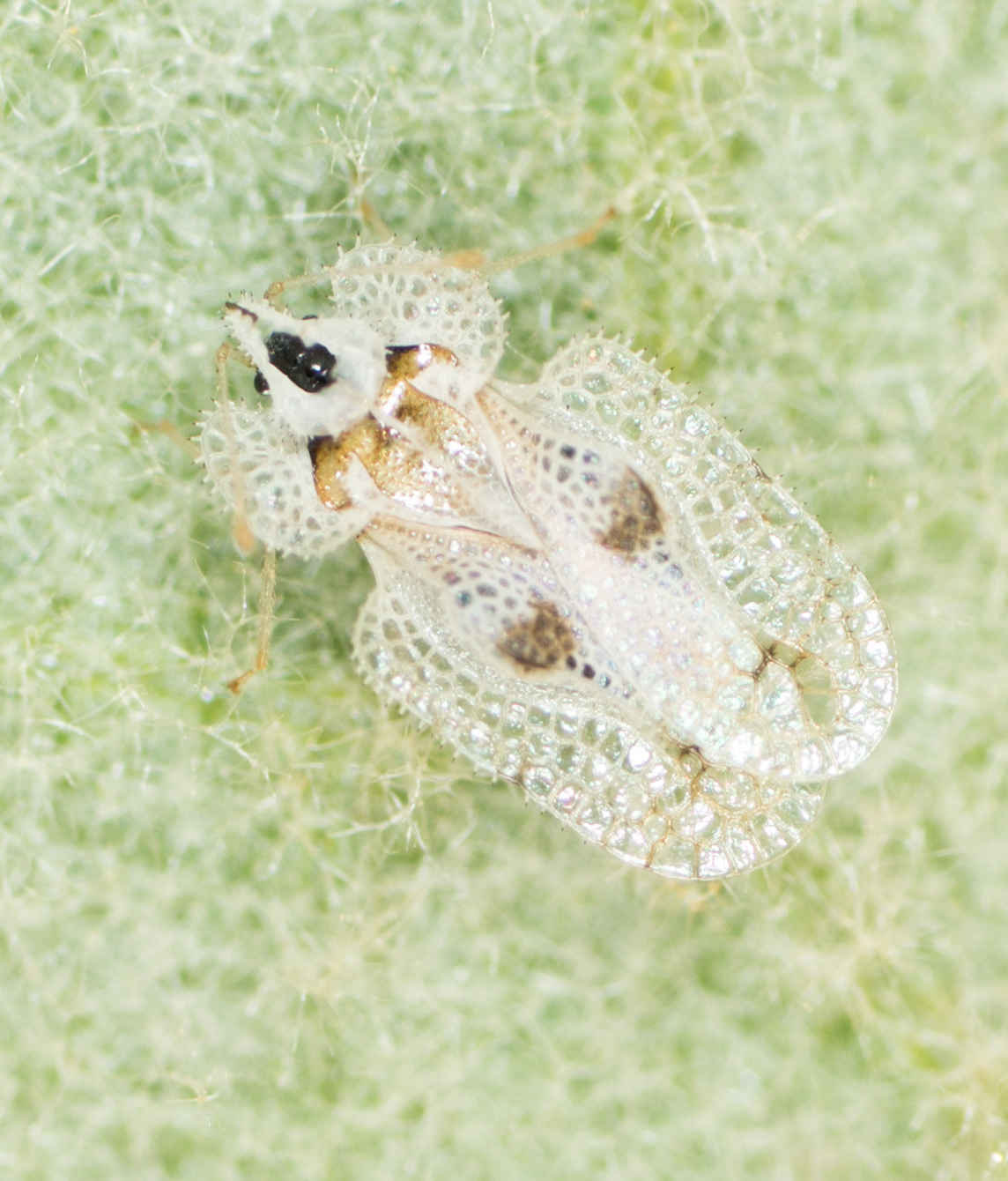

Scientific classification
- Kingdom: Animalia
- Phylum: Arthropoda
- Clade: Pancrustacea
- Class: Insecta
- Order: Hemiptera
- Suborder: Heteroptera
- Family: Tingidae
- Tribe: Tingini
- Genus: Corythucha
- Species: C. confraterna

Binomial name
- Corythucha confraterna Gibson, 1918

= Corythucha confraterna =

Species of true bug

Corythucha confraterna, known as the sycamore lace bug, is a species of lace bug in the family Tingidae. It is found in Central America and North America. Active from spring to autumn, they gather under leaves and feed on plant sap, causing the leaves to wilt and be shed early. They feed not only on sycamore trees but also ash, hickory and mulberry trees. During the winter, they shelter in bark crevices, under fallen leaves or anywhere protected near their food sources.
