= Corythucha aesculi =

Scientific classification
- Kingdom: Animalia
- Phylum: Arthropoda
- Clade: Pancrustacea
- Class: Insecta
- Order: Hemiptera
- Suborder: Heteroptera
- Family: Tingidae
- Genus: Corythucha
- Species: C. aesculi

Binomial name
- Corythucha aesculi Osborn & Drake, 1916

Species of true bug

Corythucha aesculi is a species of lace bug Tingidae native to North America. C. aesculi's host plant is the yellow buckeye, (Aesculus octandra) Marsh and the insect can attain very high densities. C. aesculi is preyed upon by a wide variety of other insects, of which ladybugs seem to be the most important.
