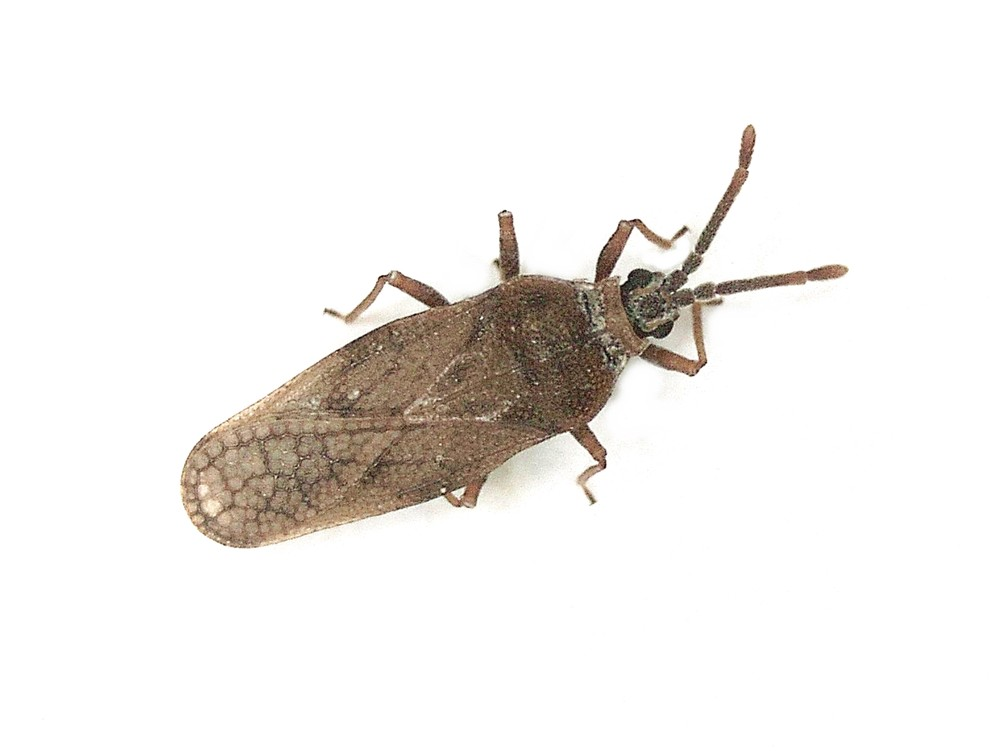

Scientific classification
- Domain: Eukaryota
- Kingdom: Animalia
- Phylum: Arthropoda
- Class: Insecta
- Order: Hemiptera
- Suborder: Heteroptera
- Family: Tingidae
- Genus: Leptoypha
- Species: L. mutica

Binomial name
- Leptoypha mutica (Say, 1832)

Synonyms
- Tingis mutica Say, 1832

= Leptoypha mutica =

Species of true bug

Leptoypha mutica, the fringetree lace bug, is a species of lace bug in the family Tingidae. It is found in Central America and North America.
