= Leptoypha minor =

Scientific classification
- Domain: Eukaryota
- Kingdom: Animalia
- Phylum: Arthropoda
- Class: Insecta
- Order: Hemiptera
- Suborder: Heteroptera
- Family: Tingidae
- Genus: Leptoypha
- Species: L. minor

Binomial name
- Leptoypha minor Mcatee, 1917

Species of true bug

Leptoypha minor also known as the Arizona ash lace bug is a species of lace bugs in the family Tingidae. It is found in North America and is very common in California. It is considered a pest that causes twig and foliage damage to Oregon ash trees in addition to other types of ashes. Adult lace bugs can be found hibernating on ash trees during the winter, and during the spring, nymphs begin to emerge. Breeding continues throughout spring until October. L. minor differs from other common lace bugs in that they are generally a light-reddish brown and can grow up to 2 mm (excluding antennae). They are compact in body form but lack the lacy lateral lobes of other lace bug species.

== Life cycle ==
Eggs

Eggs are laid partially embedded in the leaf tissue at the sides or veins on the under surfaces of leaves. A prominent, oval, disk-like cap projects upward and is prominent. The average length of the egg stage late in August in cellophane cages was 14 days. The five nymphal instars required 5, 7, 3, 3, and 6 days, making a total period of 38 days from egg to adult. Eggs usually begin appearing late in April with generations continually maturing every month until October. It seems likely that the species undergoes 4 or possibly 5 generations a year in the vicinity of Davis, Calif. The population thus builds up to injurious numbers by late summer.

Nymphs

Nymphs are flattened, spiny, and live in colonies on the under sides of leaves. After passing through five nymphal stages, they leave their cast skins on the leaf surface. This causes whitening of the leaves and a black spotting underneath due to fecal deposits.

Adults

Adults overwinter in leaf litter until the next mating season.
