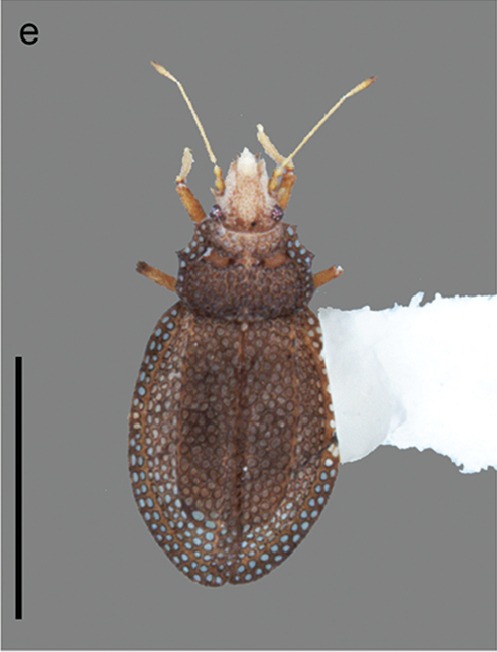

Scientific classification
- Domain: Eukaryota
- Kingdom: Animalia
- Phylum: Arthropoda
- Class: Insecta
- Order: Hemiptera
- Suborder: Heteroptera
- Family: Tingidae
- Genus: Minitingis
- Species: M. minusculus

Binomial name
- Minitingis minusculus Barber, 1954

= Minitingis minusculus =

Species of true bug

Minitingis minusculus is a species of lace bug in the family Tingidae.
