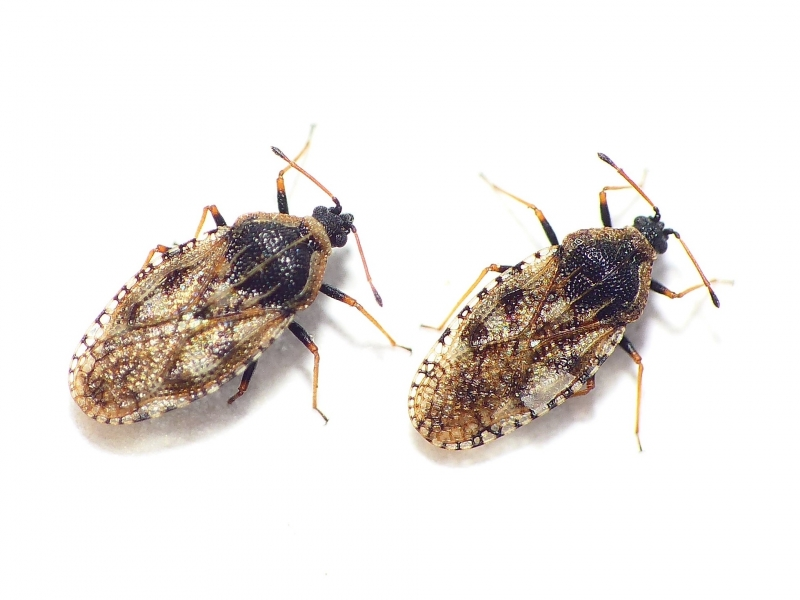
- Dictyla echii

Scientific classification
- Kingdom: Animalia
- Phylum: Arthropoda
- Clade: Pancrustacea
- Class: Insecta
- Order: Hemiptera
- Suborder: Heteroptera
- Family: Tingidae
- Tribe: Tingini
- Genus: Dictyla; Stål, 1874

Synonyms
- Horvathula Schouteden, 1957

= Dictyla =

Genus of true bugs

Dictyla is a genus of lace bugs in the family Tingidae. There are at least 80 described species in Dictyla.

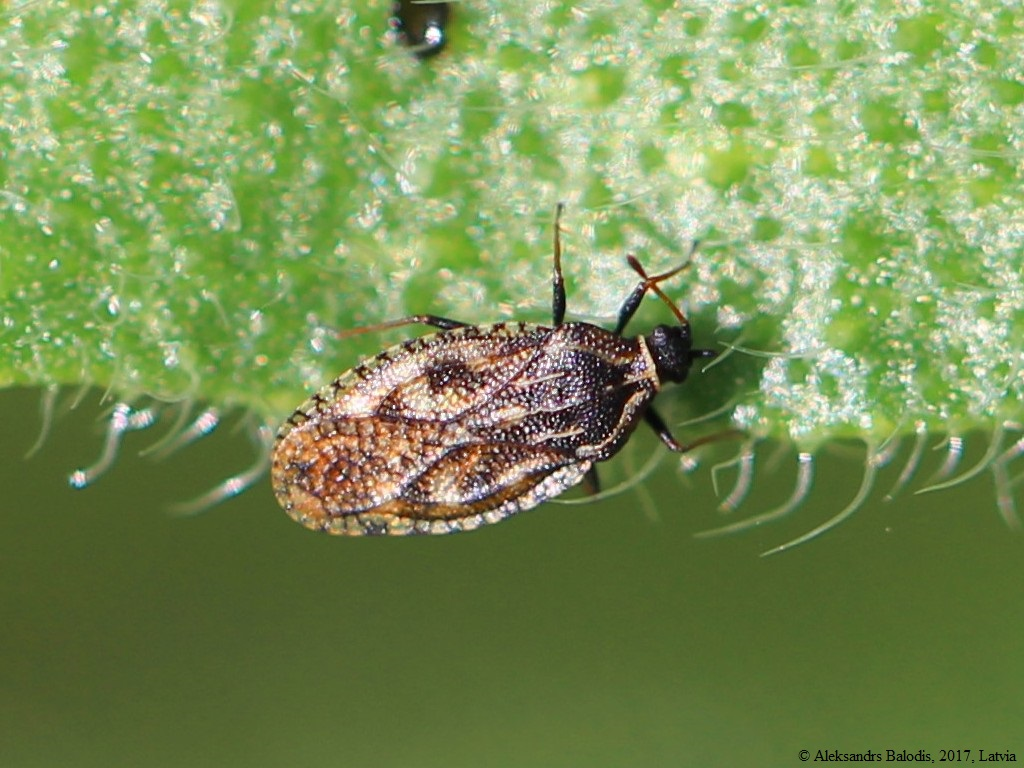
Dictyla echii

== Species ==
These 86 species belong to the genus Dictyla:

- Dictyla abyssinica (Drake, 1954)^{i c g}
- Dictyla affinis Duarte Rodrigues, 1987^{i c g}
- Dictyla aima Drake, 1961^{i c g}
- Dictyla ainsliei (Drake and Poor, 1938)^{i c g}
- Dictyla alia Drake and Cobben, 1960^{i c g}
- Dictyla amitina (Horváth, 1925)^{i c g}
- Dictyla aridula Linnavuori, 1961^{i c g}
- Dictyla aurigana (Drake, 1954)^{i c g}
- Dictyla australis Duarte Rodrigues, 1987^{i c g}
- Dictyla balli (Drake, 1922)^{i c g}
- Dictyla berryi (Drake, 1943)^{i c g}
- Dictyla burgeoni (Schouteden, 1923)^{c g}
- Dictyla cheriani (Drake, 1936)^{i c g}
- Dictyla c-nigrum (Champion, 1898)^{i c g}
- Dictyla collarti (Schouteden, 1953)^{i c}
- Dictyla coloradensis (Drake, 1917)^{i c g}
- Dictyla comes (Drake, 1948)^{i c g}
- Dictyla compressicollis Péricart, 1981^{i g}
- Dictyla concinna Golub, 1979^{i c g}
- Dictyla convergens (Herrich-Schaeffer, 1835)^{i c g}
- Dictyla dollingi Duarte Rodrigues, 1982^{i c g}
- Dictyla echii (Schrank, 1782)^{i c g b}
- Dictyla ehrethiae (Gibson in Drake, 1917)^{i c g b} (anacua lace bug)
- Dictyla eudia Drake and Quadri, 1964^{i c g}
- Dictyla evidens (Drake, 1923)^{i c g}
- Dictyla femoralis (Stål, 1873)^{i c g}
- Dictyla figurata (Drake, 1922)^{i c g}
- Dictyla flavipes (Signoret, 1861)^{i c g}
- Dictyla fulvescens (Kiritshenko, 1952)^{i c g}
- Dictyla gerardi (Schouteden, 1953)^{i c}
- Dictyla haitiensis (Drake and Poor, 1938)^{i c g}
- Dictyla heissi Linnavuori and Péricart, 2006^{i g}
- Dictyla hessarghattaensis Livingstone and Jeyanthibai, 1994^{i c g}
- Dictyla humuli (Fabricius, 1794)^{i c g}
- Dictyla imparis (Drake, 1954)^{i c g}
- Dictyla indigena (Wollaston, 1858)^{i c g}
- Dictyla jacobsi Duarte Rodrigues, 1990^{i c g}
- Dictyla labeculata (Uhler, 1893)^{i c g b}
- Dictyla leporis (Drake, 1937)^{i c g}
- Dictyla lithospermi Ribes, 1967^{i c g}
- Dictyla litotes Drake and Hill, 1964^{i c g}
- Dictyla loricata (Distant, 1888)^{i c g}
- Dictyla lupata (Drake and Poor, 1936)^{i c g}
- Dictyla lupudi (Herrich-Schaeffer, 1837)^{c g}
- Dictyla lupuli (Herrich-Schaeffer, 1837)^{i g}
- Dictyla minuta Golub, 1976^{i c g}
- Dictyla monotropidia (Stål, 1858)^{i c g}
- Dictyla montandoni (Horváth, 1885)^{i c g}
- Dictyla nassata (Puton, 1874)^{i c g}
- Dictyla nigra Golub, 1982^{i c g}
- Dictyla nodipennis (Horváth, 1910)^{i c g}
- Dictyla novaki Drake and Ruhoff, 1962^{i c g}
- Dictyla orientalis Golub, 1982^{i c g}
- Dictyla parilis (Drake, 1936)^{i c g}
- Dictyla parmata (Distant, 1888)^{i c g}
- Dictyla patquiana (Drake, 1955)^{i c g}
- Dictyla pauliani Duarte Rodrigues, 1992^{i c g}
- Dictyla picturata (Distant, 1902)^{i c g}
- Dictyla platyoma (Fieber, 1861)^{i c g}
- Dictyla poecilla Drake and Hill, 1964^{i c g}
- Dictyla pongana (Drake, 1953)^{i c g}
- Dictyla pucallpana (Drake and Hambleton, 1945)^{i c g}
- Dictyla putoni (Montandon, 1895)^{i c g}
- Dictyla rasilis (Drake and Maa, 1955)^{i c g}
- Dictyla rotundata (Herrich-Schaeffer, 1835)^{i g}
- Dictyla ruficeps (Horváth, 1905)^{i c g}
- Dictyla sahlbergi (Horváth, 1906)^{i g}
- Dictyla salhbergi (Horvath, 1906)^{c g}
- Dictyla salicorum (Baba, 1925)^{i c g}
- Dictyla sauteri (Drake, 1923)^{i c g}
- Dictyla schoutedeni Duarte Rodrigues, 1979^{i c g}
- Dictyla senegalensis Duarte Rodrigues, 1979^{i c g}
- Dictyla seorsa (Drake and Poor, 1937)^{i c g}
- Dictyla sessoris (Drake and Poor, 1937)^{i c g}
- Dictyla sima Seidenstücker, 1975^{i c g}
- Dictyla sjoestedti (Horváth, 1910)^{i g}
- Dictyla sjostedti (Horváth, 1910)^{c g}
- Dictyla subdola (Horváth, 1905)^{i c g}
- Dictyla theroni Duarte Rodrigues, 1988^{i c g}
- Dictyla triconula (Seidenstücker, 1954)^{i c g}
- Dictyla tuberosa (Horváth, 1929)^{i c g}
- Dictyla uichancoi (Drake and Poor, 1937)^{i c g}
- Dictyla uniseriata (Horváth, 1929)^{i c g}
- Dictyla variabilis Duarte Rodrigues, 1976^{i c g}
- Dictyla veterna (Scudder, 1890)^{i c g}
- Dictyla wollastoni (Heer, 1865)^{i c g}

Data sources: i = ITIS, c = Catalogue of Life, g = GBIF, b = Bugguide.net
