= Corythucha juglandis =

Scientific classification
- Kingdom: Animalia
- Phylum: Arthropoda
- Clade: Pancrustacea
- Class: Insecta
- Order: Hemiptera
- Suborder: Heteroptera
- Family: Tingidae
- Genus: Corythucha
- Species: C. juglandis

Binomial name
- Corythucha juglandis (Fitch, 1857)

Synonyms
- Tingis juglandis Fitch, 1857

Species of true bug

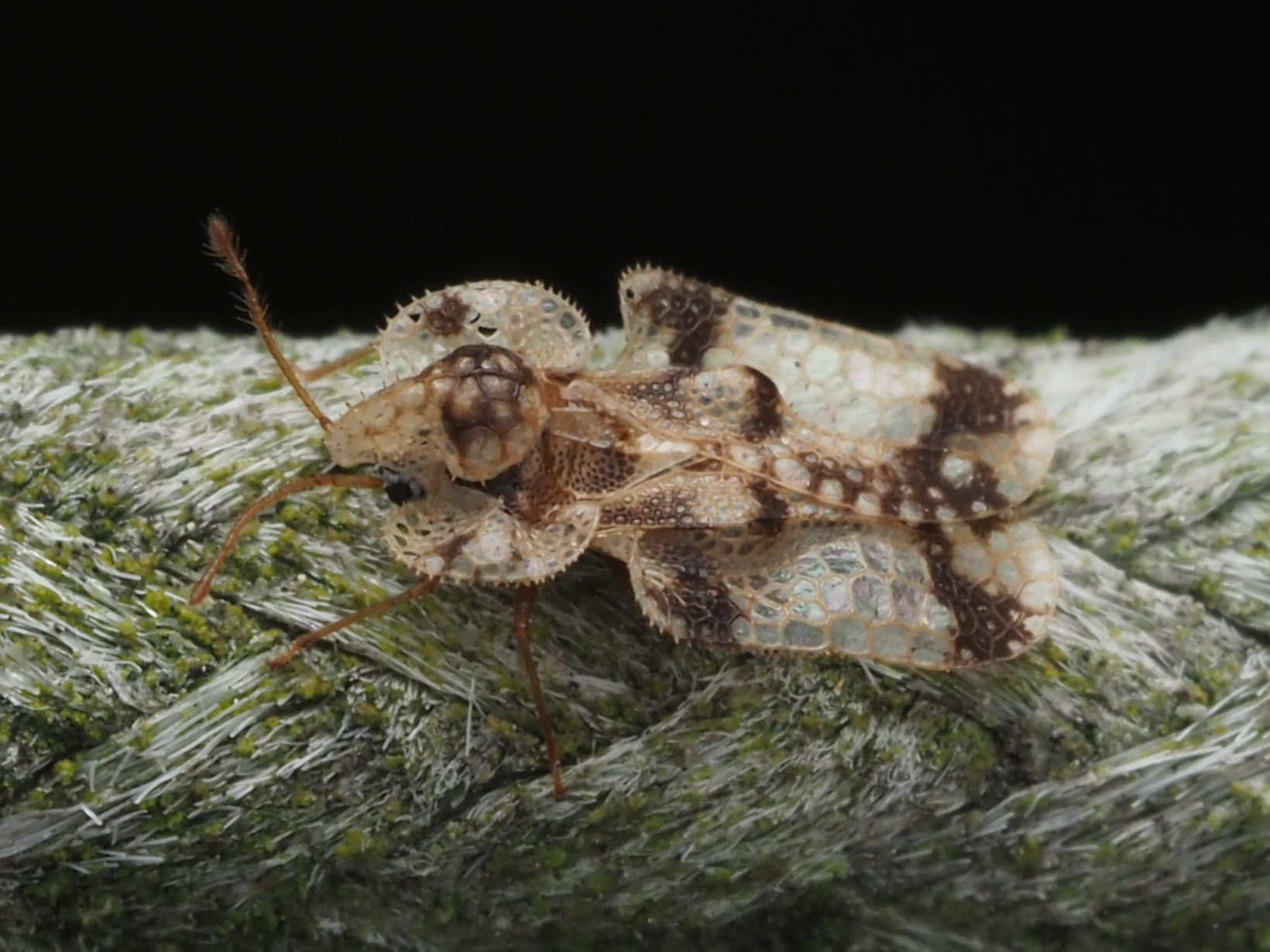

Corythucha juglandis, the walnut lace bug, is a species of lace bug in the family Tingidae. It is found in North America. It feeds on Tilia americana and overwinters in leaf litter. Both adults and nymphs are gregarious.
