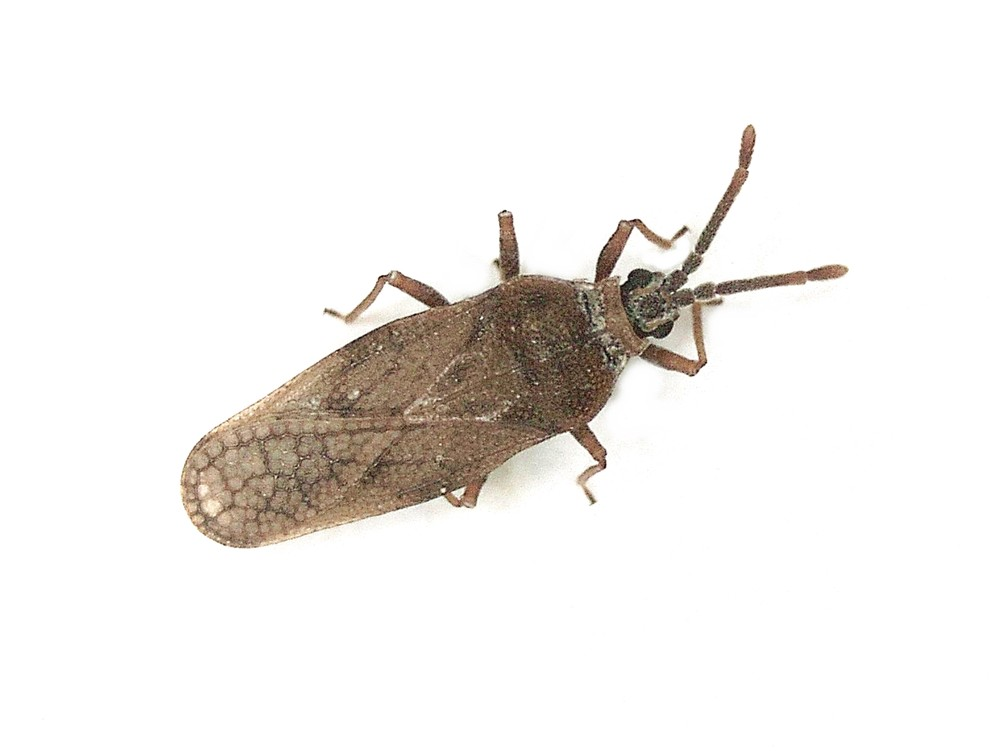
- Leptoypha mutica

Scientific classification
- Kingdom: Animalia
- Phylum: Arthropoda
- Clade: Pancrustacea
- Class: Insecta
- Order: Hemiptera
- Suborder: Heteroptera
- Family: Tingidae
- Tribe: Tingini
- Genus: Leptoypha; Stål, 1873

= Leptoypha =

Genus of true bugs

Leptoypha is a genus of lace bugs in the family Tingidae. There are about 17 described species in Leptoypha.

== Species ==
These 17 species belong to the genus Leptoypha:

- Leptoypha anceps (Horváth, 1925)
- Leptoypha barberi Drake & Ruhoff, 1960
- Leptoypha binotata Champion, 1897
- Leptoypha braziliensis Drake and Hambleton, 1939
- Leptoypha brevicornis Champion, 1897
- Leptoypha capitata (Jakovlev, 1876)
- Leptoypha costata Parshley, 1917
- Leptoypha drakei McAtee, 1919
- Leptoypha elliptica McAtee, 1917
- Leptoypha hospita Drake and Poor, 1937 (privet lace bug)
- Leptoypha ilicis Drake, 1919
- Leptoypha luzona Drake and Ruhoff, 1961
- Leptoypha mcateei Drake, 1921
- Leptoypha minor Mcatee, 1917
- Leptoypha morrisoni Drake, 1922
- Leptoypha mutica (Say, 1832) (fringetree lace bug)
- Leptoypha wuorentausi (Lindberg, 1927)
