= Dictyla labeculata =

Scientific classification
- Domain: Eukaryota
- Kingdom: Animalia
- Phylum: Arthropoda
- Class: Insecta
- Order: Hemiptera
- Suborder: Heteroptera
- Family: Tingidae
- Tribe: Tingini
- Genus: Dictyla
- Species: D. labeculata

Binomial name
- Dictyla labeculata (Uhler, 1893)

Synonyms
- Monanthia labeculata Uhler, 1893

Species of true bug

Dictyla labeculata is a species of lace bug in the family Tingidae. It is found in North America.
