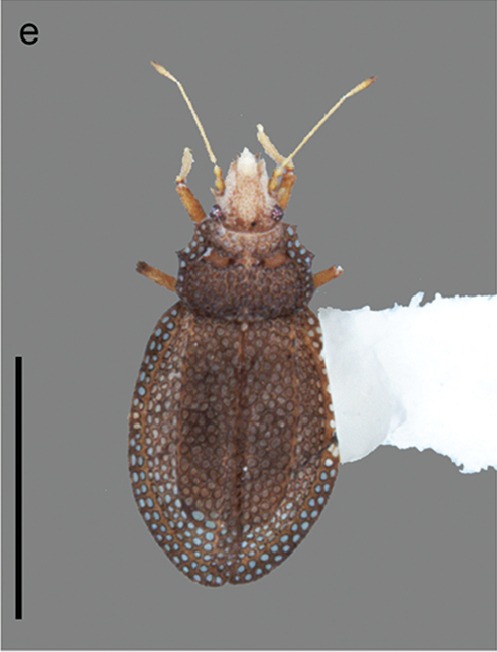
- Minitingis minusculus

Scientific classification
- Kingdom: Animalia
- Phylum: Arthropoda
- Clade: Pancrustacea
- Class: Insecta
- Order: Hemiptera
- Suborder: Heteroptera
- Family: Tingidae
- Subfamily: Cantacaderinae
- Genus: Minitingis; Barber, 1954

= Minitingis =

Genus of true bugs

Minitingis is a genus of lace bugs in the family Tingidae. There are at least two described species in Minitingis.

== Species ==
These two species belong to the genus Minitingis:

- Minitingis elsae Froeschner, 1968
- Minitingis minusculus Barber, 1954
