= Corythucha floridana =

Scientific classification
- Kingdom: Animalia
- Phylum: Arthropoda
- Clade: Pancrustacea
- Class: Insecta
- Order: Hemiptera
- Suborder: Heteroptera
- Family: Tingidae
- Genus: Corythucha
- Species: C. floridana

Binomial name
- Corythucha floridana Heidemann, 1909

Species of true bug

Corythucha floridana, the Florida oak lace bug, is a species in the family Tingidae, the lace bugs, that is associated with oak trees.

== Description ==
The adult Corythucha floridana is between 2.3 and 2.6 mm (0.09 and 0.10 in) in length; The colour is white apart from some brown at the base of the elytra (wing-cases).
