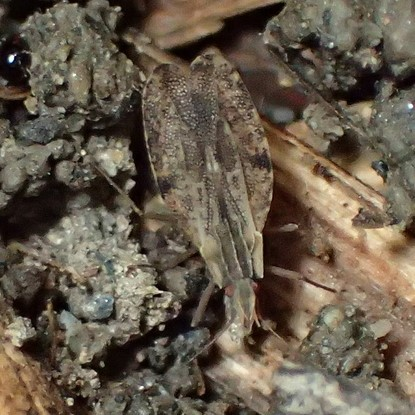
- Cantacader lethierryi

Scientific classification
- Kingdom: Animalia
- Phylum: Arthropoda
- Clade: Pancrustacea
- Class: Insecta
- Order: Hemiptera
- Suborder: Heteroptera
- Family: Tingidae
- Subfamily: Cantacaderinae; Stål, 1873

Tribes
- Cantacaderini Stål, 1873; Carldrakeanini B. Lis, 1999; Ceratocaderini B. Lis, 1999; Golmoniini Popov, 1989

= Cantacaderinae =

Subfamily of true bugs

Cantacaderinae is a subfamily of lace bugs in the family Tingidae. There are about 17 genera and at least 95 described species in Cantacaderinae.

== Genera ==
These 17 genera belong to the subfamily Cantacaderinae:

- Afghanoderus B. Lis, 2001
- Allocader Drake, 1950
- Australocader B. Lis, 1997
- Caledoderus Guilbert, 2012
- Cantacader Amyot & Serville, 1843
- Carldrakeana Froeschner, 1968
- Ceratocader Drake, 1950
- Coolacader Moir, 2022
- Cyperobia Bergroth, 1927
- Minitingis Barber, 1954
- Nectocader Drake, 1928
- Pseudophatnoma Blöte, 1945
- Stenocader Drake & Hambleton, 1944
- Teratocader Drake, 1950
- † Golmonia Popov, 1989
- † Lutetiacader Wappler, 2006
- † Paleocader Froeschner, 1996
