= Corythucha morrilli =

Scientific classification
- Kingdom: Animalia
- Phylum: Arthropoda
- Clade: Pancrustacea
- Class: Insecta
- Order: Hemiptera
- Suborder: Heteroptera
- Family: Tingidae
- Tribe: Tingini
- Genus: Corythucha
- Species: C. morrilli

Binomial name
- Corythucha morrilli Osborn & Drake, 1917

Species of true bug

Corythucha morrilli, the morrill lace bug, is a species of lace bug in the family Tingidae. It is found in Australia, the Caribbean, Central America, North America, and Oceania.
