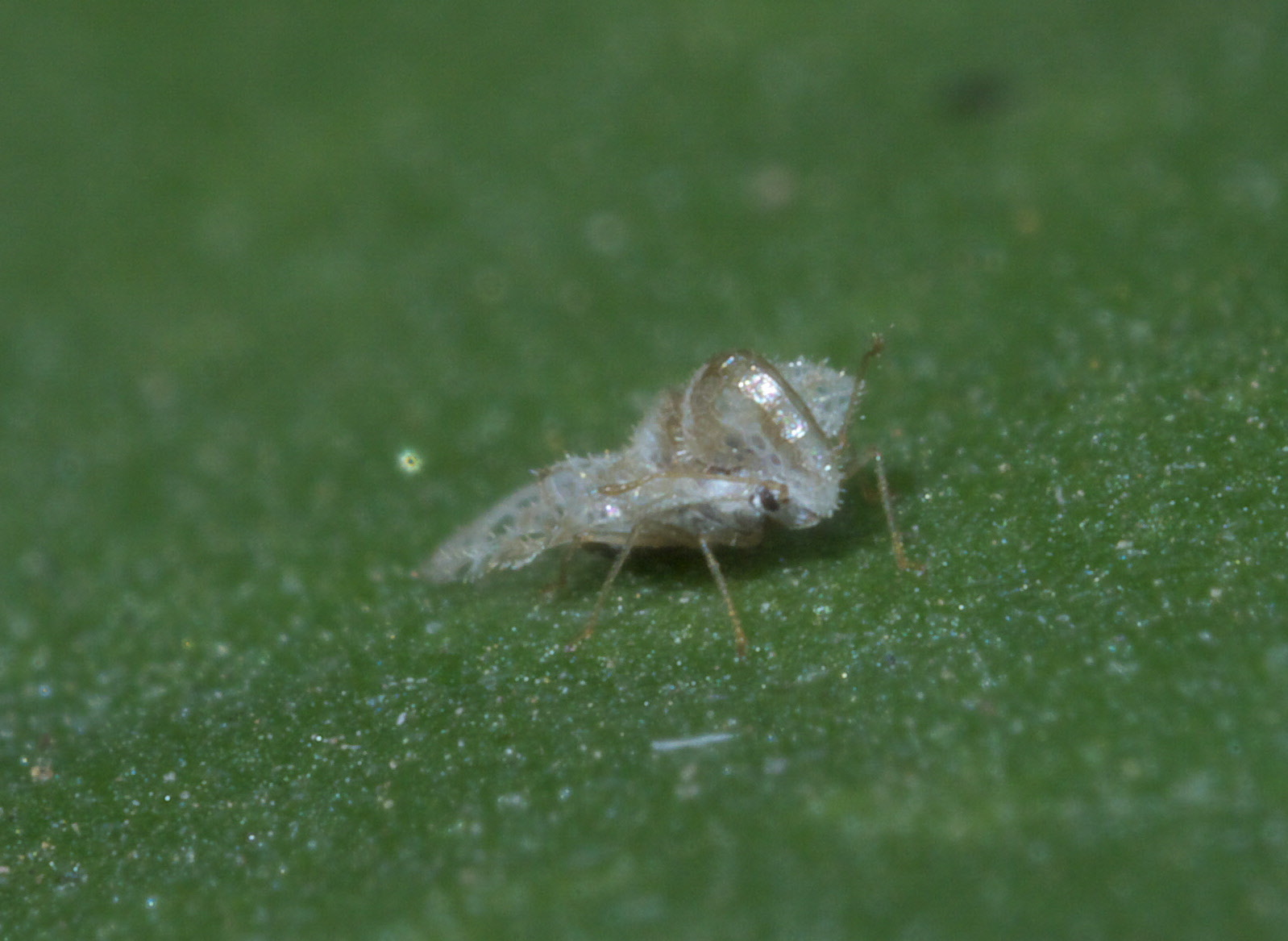

Scientific classification
- Kingdom: Animalia
- Phylum: Arthropoda
- Clade: Pancrustacea
- Class: Insecta
- Order: Hemiptera
- Suborder: Heteroptera
- Family: Tingidae
- Genus: Corythucha
- Species: C. marmorata

Binomial name
- Corythucha marmorata (Uhler, 1878)

Synonyms
- Tingis marmorata Uhler, 1878

= Corythucha marmorata =

Species of true bug

Corythucha marmorata, the chrysanthemum lace bug, is a species of lace bug in the family Tingidae. It is found in Central America and North America.

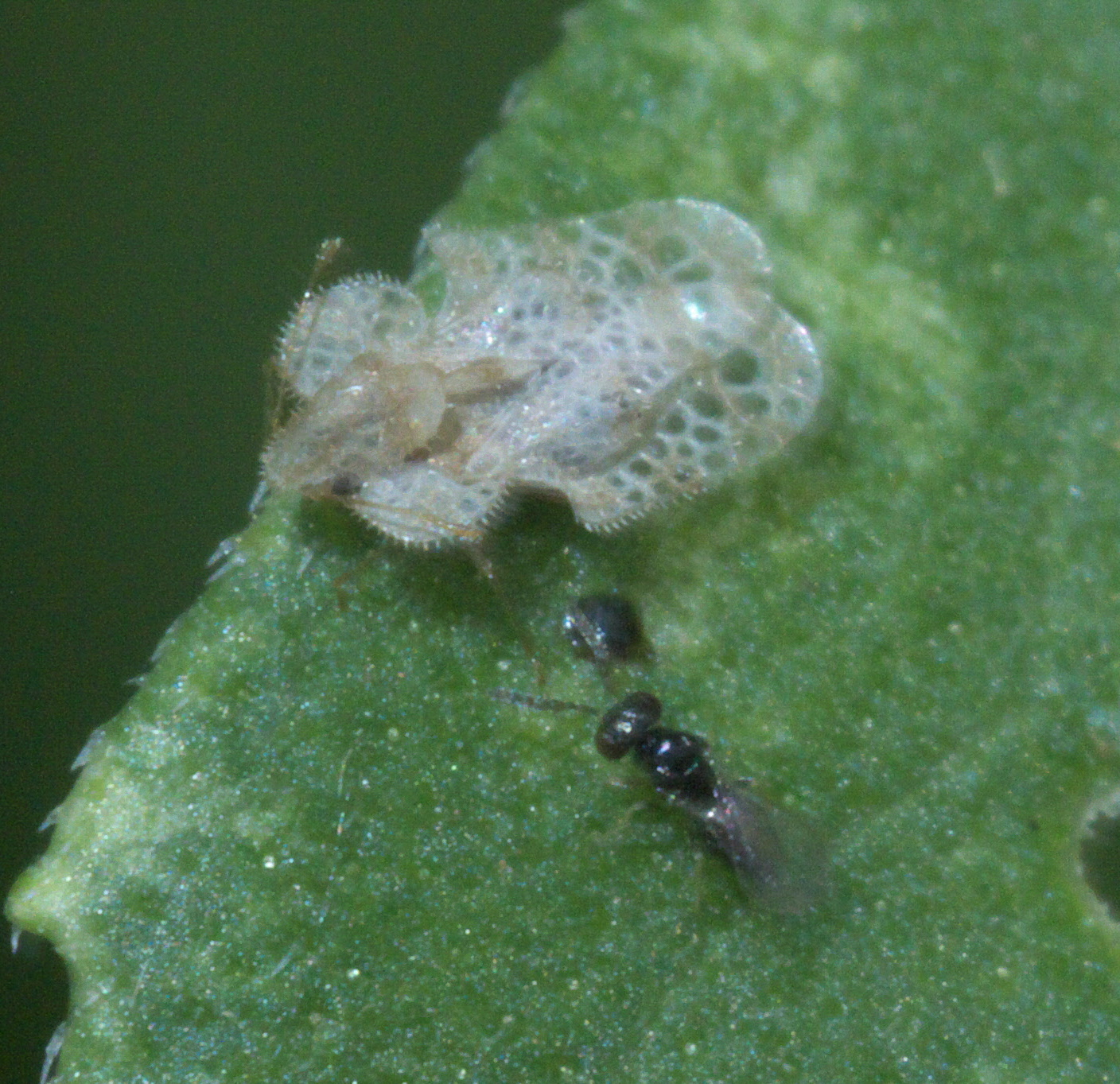
Chrysanthemum lace bug, Corythucha marmorata

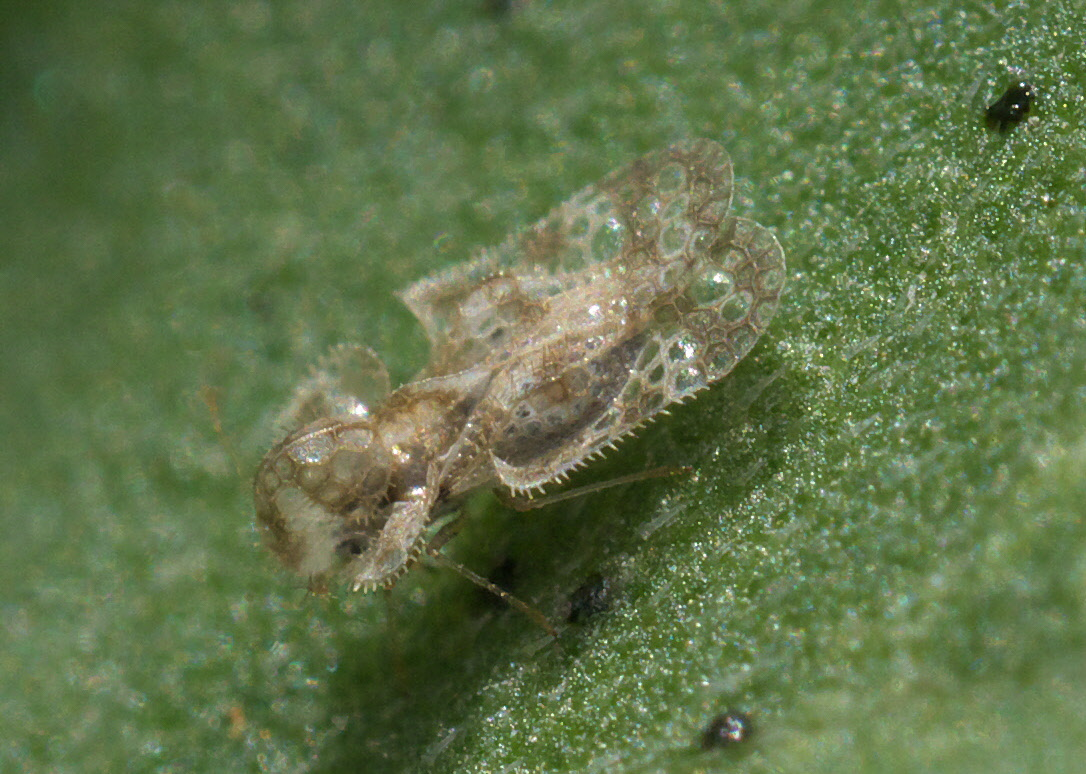
Chrysanthemum lace bug, Corythucha marmorata

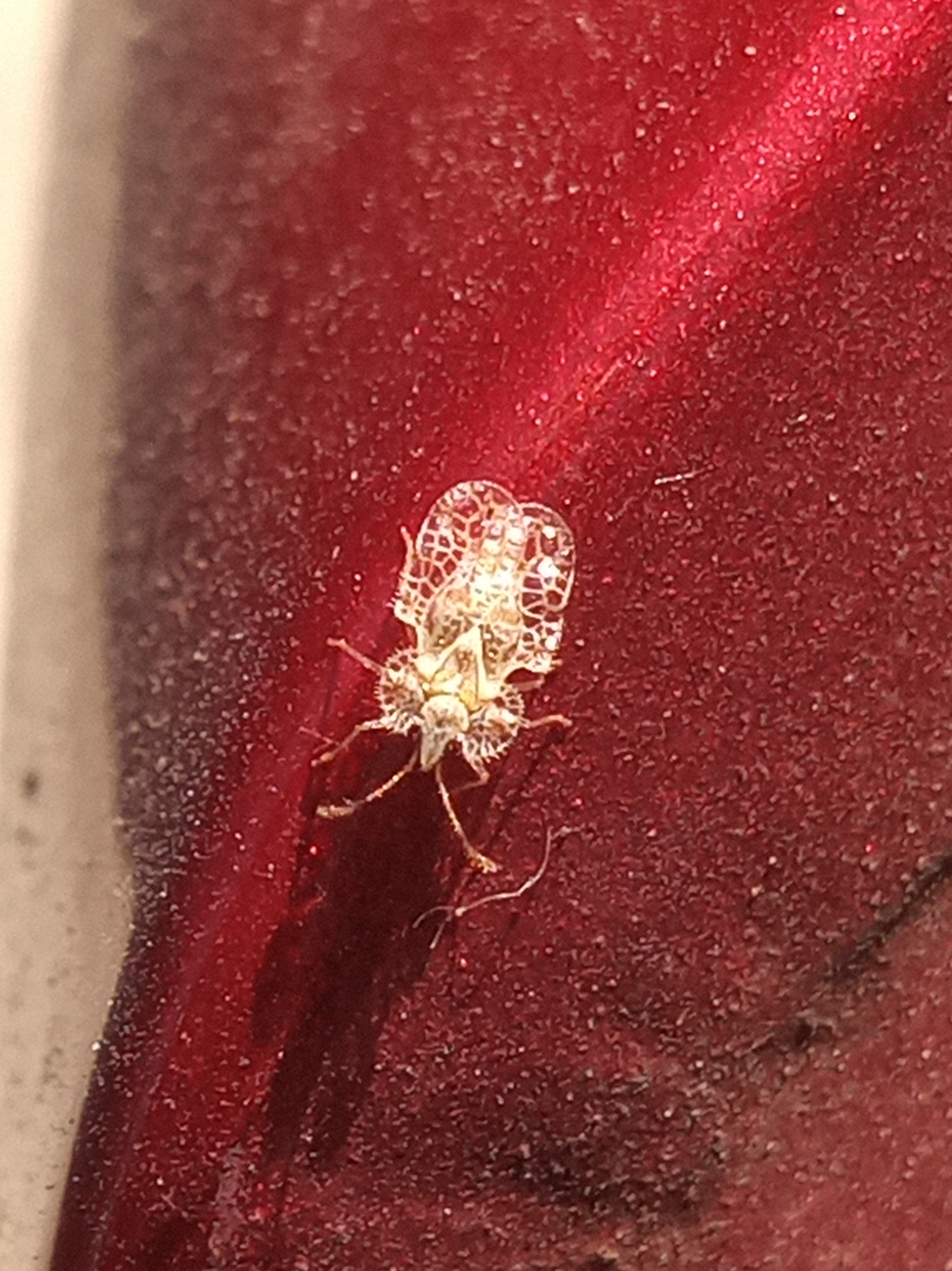
Chrysanthemum lace bug, Corythucha marmorata
