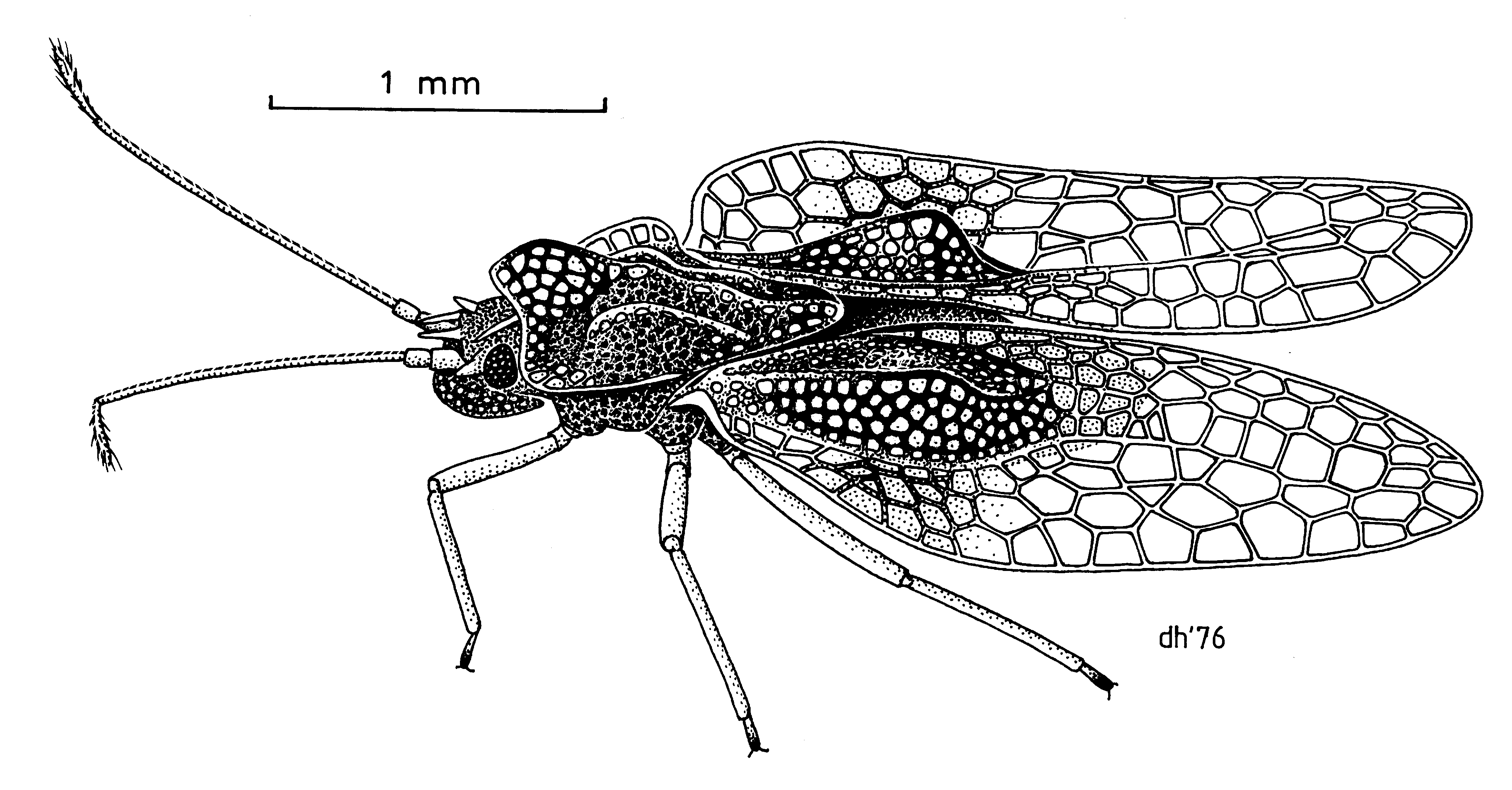
- Tanybyrsa cumberi

Scientific classification
- Kingdom: Animalia
- Phylum: Arthropoda
- Clade: Pancrustacea
- Class: Insecta
- Order: Hemiptera
- Suborder: Heteroptera
- Infraorder: Cimicomorpha
- Superfamily: Miroidea
- Family: Tingidae; Laporte, 1832

Subfamilies
- †Tingiometrinae Heiss, Golub, & Popov, 2015; Cantacaderinae Stål, 1873; Tinginae Laporte, 1832; Vianaidinae Kormilev, 1955

= Tingidae =

Tingidae Temporal range: Ladinian–Present

Family of true bugs

The Tingidae, commonly referred to as lace bugs due to their intricate wings, are a family of very small (2–10 mm (0.08-0.39 in)) insects in the order Hemiptera. These insects exist in multiple regions of the world and live on various plants, depending on the species. There are roughly 2,000 described species across the 3 subfamilies which include Cantacaderinae, Tinginae and Vianaidinae.

== Characteristics ==
They have two main life stages, nymphal and adult. The nymphal period consists of 5 instar stages each similar but unique in their own manners lasting a total of 8–16 days. The first instar stage occurs after hatching and lasts typically 2–4 days, the molt is oblong shaped and transforms from a pale brown to a brownish-black coloured cuticle. The second instar also typically lasts 2–4 days, it remains a dark brown-black colour but the molt is rounded instead, the abdominal surface have indications of spinal projections along the body's margin. The third instar typically lasts 2–3 days and the molt remains round but larger in size with short cephalic spines. The fourth instar lasts 1–3 days and the molt continues to grow in size, large cephalic spines as well as a wider paranotum on the thorax are observed. Finally, the fifth instar stage lasts 1–2 days and is very similar to the previous stage but the molt transforms back into an elongated body form. This concludes the nymphal stage, transforming the cuticle into its adult life form.

The adult life forms are quite small with typical body size ranging anywhere from 2–10 mm (0.08-0.39 in), varying in shape, from quadrate, broadly oval or narrow. Tingidae are sexually differentiated with females being larger and having an ovipositor while the males are smaller with a genital capsule. They are cryptic in colouration, varying from the whitish-yellow range to dark brown and black. They have very intricate partially transparent hyaline forewings and pronotum wings, the detailing is lace-like giving Tingidae the common name "lace bug". On the thorax is the pronotum as well as a hollow outgrowth on the dorso-lateral region. They have 2 sets of wings; a pair of forewings and pronotum wings, which vary in size between individuals, typically having reduced forewings and larger pronotum wings. Despite their apparent beauty, the wings are highly decorative and adults are poor fliers, carrying out their sedentary lifestyle on leaves and the shoots of plants.

Due to their lifestyle, Tingidae require unique cephalic characteristics. Their heads are either fully concealed or partially obscured under a hood-like projection arising from the pronotum. Some develop spine-like projections while others do not, and all possess a 4-way segmented antennae, with the third one being the longest. The lack of ocelli is a distinguishing feature of the family Tingidae. Due to their habitat, their diet consists of high quality sap which requires their mouth pieces to be both a sucker and a piercer. Tingidae have thin elongated legs with tarsi divided into two tarsomeres, allowing them to maneuver around the plant they are inhabiting.

== Reproduction and development ==
Each individual usually completes its entire lifecycle on the same plant, if not the same part of the plant. The number of generations a species has annually is determined through photoperiodic induction. Most species have one to two generations per year, but some species have multiple generations. For example, all southern Indian Tingids are multivoltine, while most European species are univoltine. The location where Tingidae species lay their eggs on the host plant varies, partially influenced by the specialization of their ovipositor. Eggs can be laid in the plant leaf lamina by being inserted horizontally to the leaf surface or by being inserted at an angle into the mesophyll. Oviposition also can occur in the leaf midrib, in floral parts such as the calyx or pistil, and in the stem. Tingidae lay dipause and non-cleidoic eggs. Due to the high water requirement for eggs to develop, the changes in moisture levels throughout seasons can impact the number of generations per year. A mechanism to cope with the fluctuations is to overwinter as eggs or nymphs; however, most overwinter as adults. Tingidae has incomplete metamorphosis in that the immature stages resemble the adults, except they are smaller and do not have wings. Maternal care of offspring is rare, however has been observed in some genera. For example, in Gargaphia solani, one female will brood not only its own eggs but also the eggs of other females, which as a result increases the survival rate of the offspring while reducing the number of females exposed to danger.

== Habitat ==
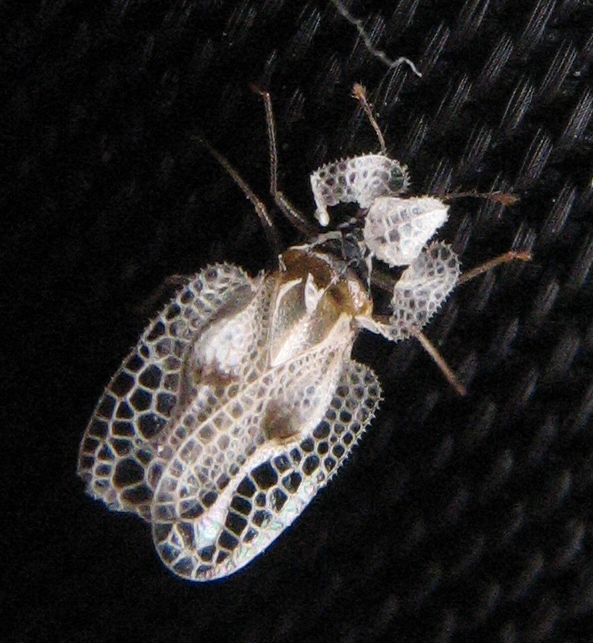
Corythucha ciliata - Found by the river Neckar in Heidelberg, Germany.

Tingidae are generally host-specific and are all completely phytophagous. Different species are dependent on a certain plant or a group of closely related plants for feeding. Different adaptations allows them to occupy a variety of different habitats. Habitats of multiple species can occur on a singular plant where different species can occupy anywhere between the roots and the top canopy. With the majority of the members of family Tingidae having a sedentary lifestyle, many are found to inhabit the underside of leaves. Tingidae are able to withdraw sap from the plant by penetrating their stylet into the living plant tissue. Due to their feeding style, this method can be destructive to plants. The removal of sap from the plant cells causes the leaves to become discoloured and can eventually lead to wilted leaves.

Natural predators of Tingidae are not usually seen until populations become abundant. These predators include ladybugs, parasitic wasps, lacewings, and spiders. In Europe it was seen that natural predators increased when the population of Corythucha arcuata, oak lace bugs, increased. The natural predators of the oak lace bug located in Europe included lacewings, velvet mites and spiders. However even with the increase in predators, there was no significant decrease and regulation of the invasive oak lace bug.

For the species of Tingidae that inhabit the leaves of trees, some species of the genus Corythucha have been reported to land on humans and bite. Their bites may cause pain but are often not a concern to human health. Corythucha ciliata bites have been reported in Europe in countries of Italy, France and Romania. In some of these reported cases, the effects of C. ciliata bites have caused skin conditions such as dermatosis.

== Phylogeny ==
Tingidae consist of roughly 2000 species in 3 subfamilies, Cantacadericies, Tinginae and Viananidinae. All 3 subfamilies can be found ubiquitous across the globe. The Cantacadericies are mainly concentrated all over the Southern Hemisphere, while Tinginae are located within tropical and temperate zones and Viananidinae in neotropical regions. Tinginae is the subfamily consistent of lace bugs, it includes 220 genera out of the 250 total identified Tingidae species. The higher order is as follows:

- Order: Hemiptera
  - Suborder: Heteroptera
    - Superfamily: Tingoidea
      - Family: Tingidae
        - Subfamily: Cantacaderinae
        - Subfamily: Tinginae
        - Subfamily: Vianaidinae

Members have been found in the fossil record from the Middle Triassic onwards, with the oldest being Archetingis from the Middle Triassic Meride Limestone. The second oldest fossil record of this family is Sinaldocader from the Early Cretaceous Zaza Formation of Buryatia, Russia. A new subfamily and genus of Tingidae was recently discovered in a piece of Burmese amber. The preserved bug was assigned to the family Tingidae since it shared important morphological characteristics such as areolate hemelytra and paranota as well as 4-segmented antennae and labium. However, there were also significant differences that did not align with the previously established subfamilies such as the absence of spines on the head and a large scutellum. These differences helped lead to the recognition of the new subfamily Tingiometrinae and the species of the lace bug in the amber classified as Tingiometra burmanica.

== Ecological importance ==
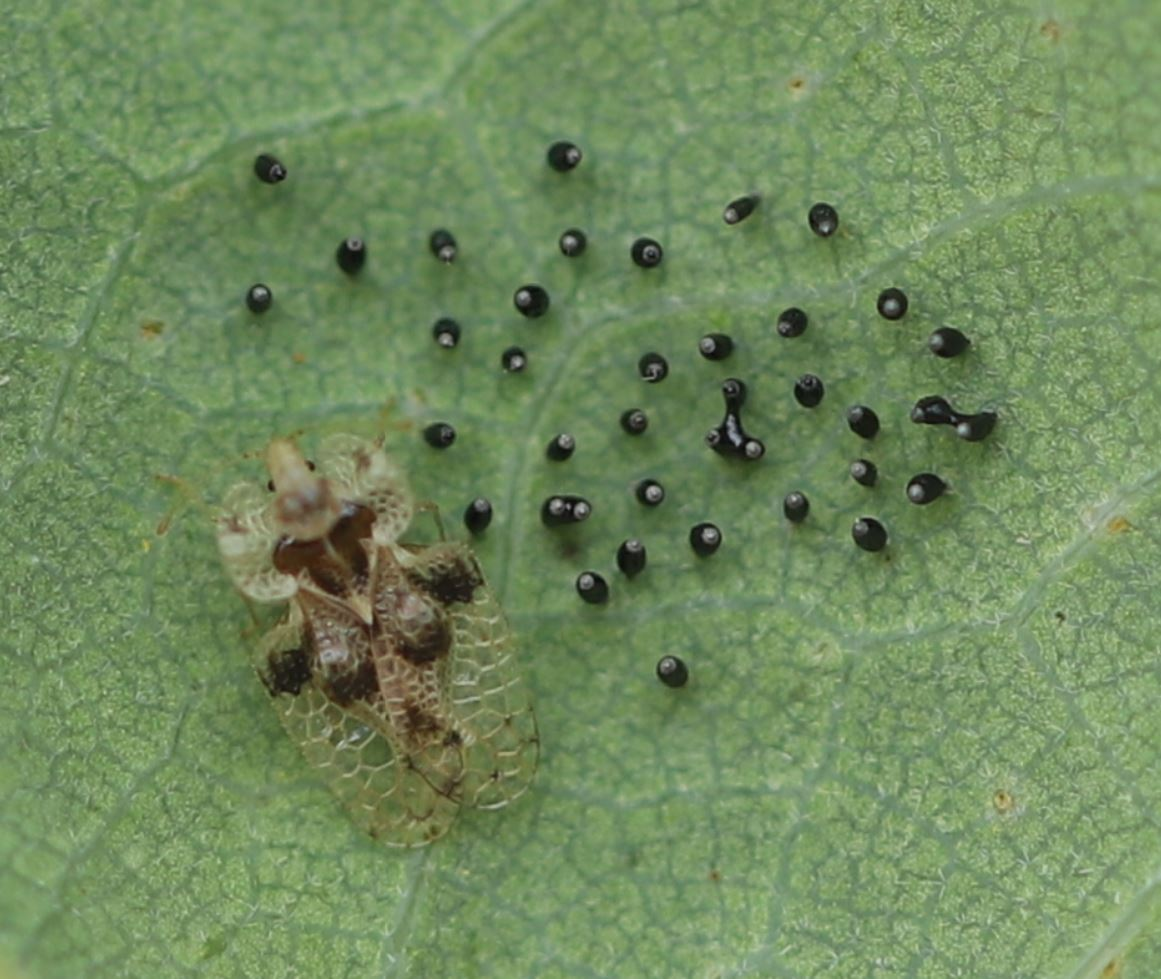
Corythucha arcuata - Oak lace bug with eggs on the underside of an oak leaf

Lace bugs pose a potential threat to plants. Although not all species of lace bugs are pests, some species can affect various types of trees and crops of human consumption. Corythucha arcuata is a specific invasive Tingid that can cause significant damage to trees. C.arcuata, native to North America, was first reported in Italy in 2002 and has since spread to multiple countries, causing considerable damage. The pest causes chlorotic disease in oak along with the premature loss of leaves. Furthermore, there have been reports of bites and skin irritations from the species in urban areas. Insecticides have been used to keep C.arcruata at bay, however, this can result in unfavourable effects on the surrounding environment. Mechanical control methods, including the use of yellow sticky traps and suction traps, have also been employed.

Tingidae can act as possible biological control agents when controlling specific weed populations. In New Zealand, the invasive weed Solanum mauritianum, also known as woolly nightshade can be controlled by releasing Gargaphia decoris. Higher numbers of G. decoris were spotted on the leaves of woolly nightshade when grown in the shade when compared to ones growing in full sunlight. G. decoris causes damage by removing chlorophyll from the leaves, which ultimately decreases the rate of photosynthesis of the woolly nightshade. Gargaphia decoris sap-feeding method can further reduce photosynthesis by reducing the diffusion of gases through the plants stomata. In addition, the reduced rates of stomatal conductance inhibits Solanum mauritianum ability to participate in evaporative cooling leading to a greater damaging effect, especially in the leaves that received full sunlight. The impact of G. decoris on controlling the invasive species is greatest through the combination of their feeding methods and indirectly through factors, like accumulated heat from sunlight, that cause physiological impairment.

== Gallery ==
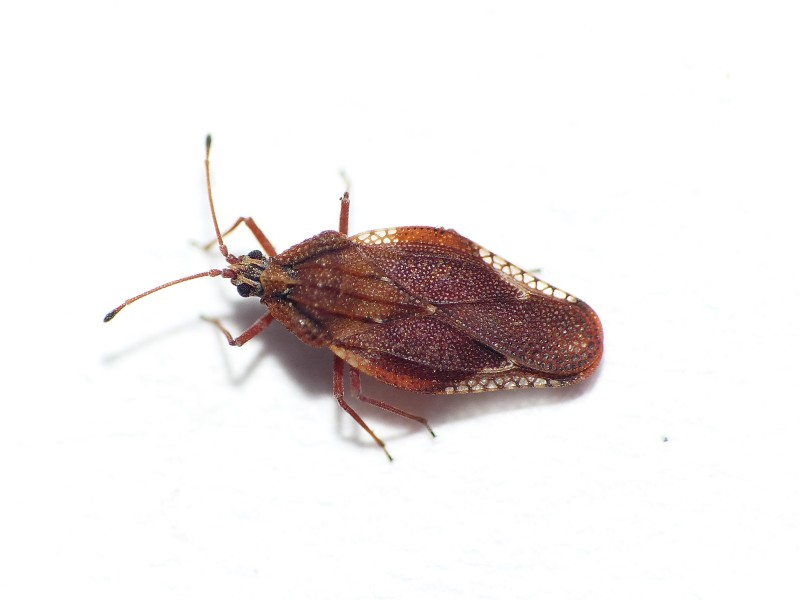
Physatocheila smreczynskii – Netherlands

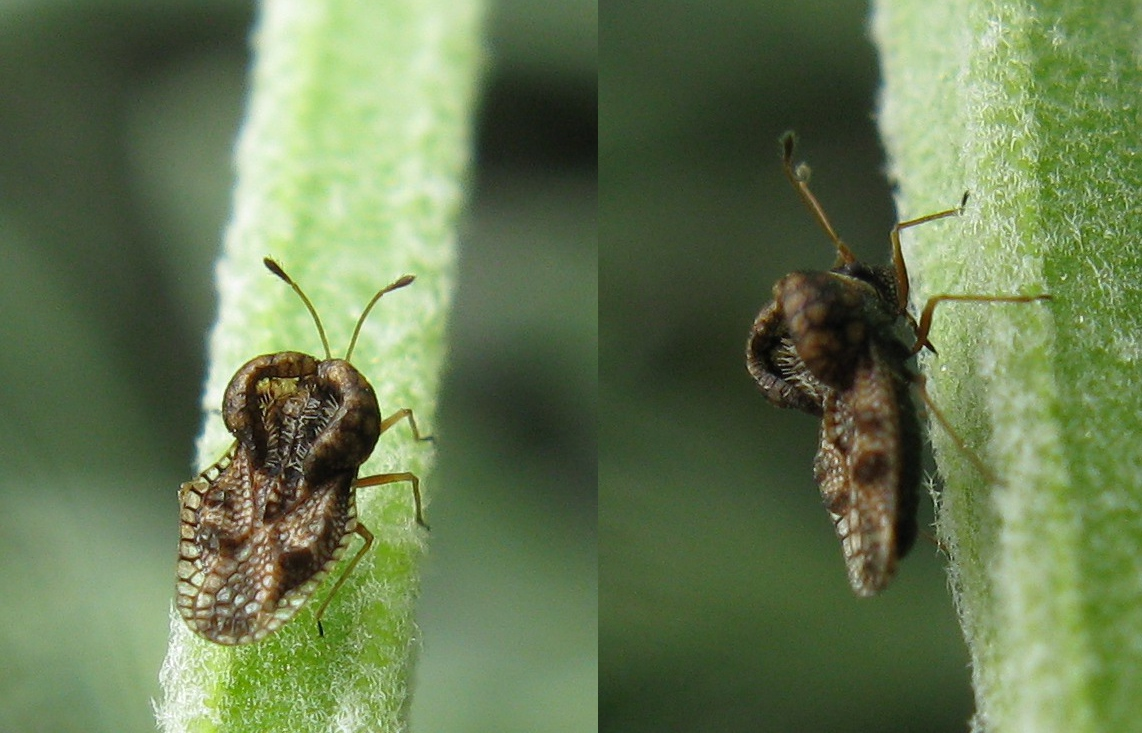
Adult specimen of a small (about 2 mm) species of lace bug on Lavandula Cape Town in South Africa: Left, dorsal view; right, lateral view, showing proboscis and dorsal protuberances

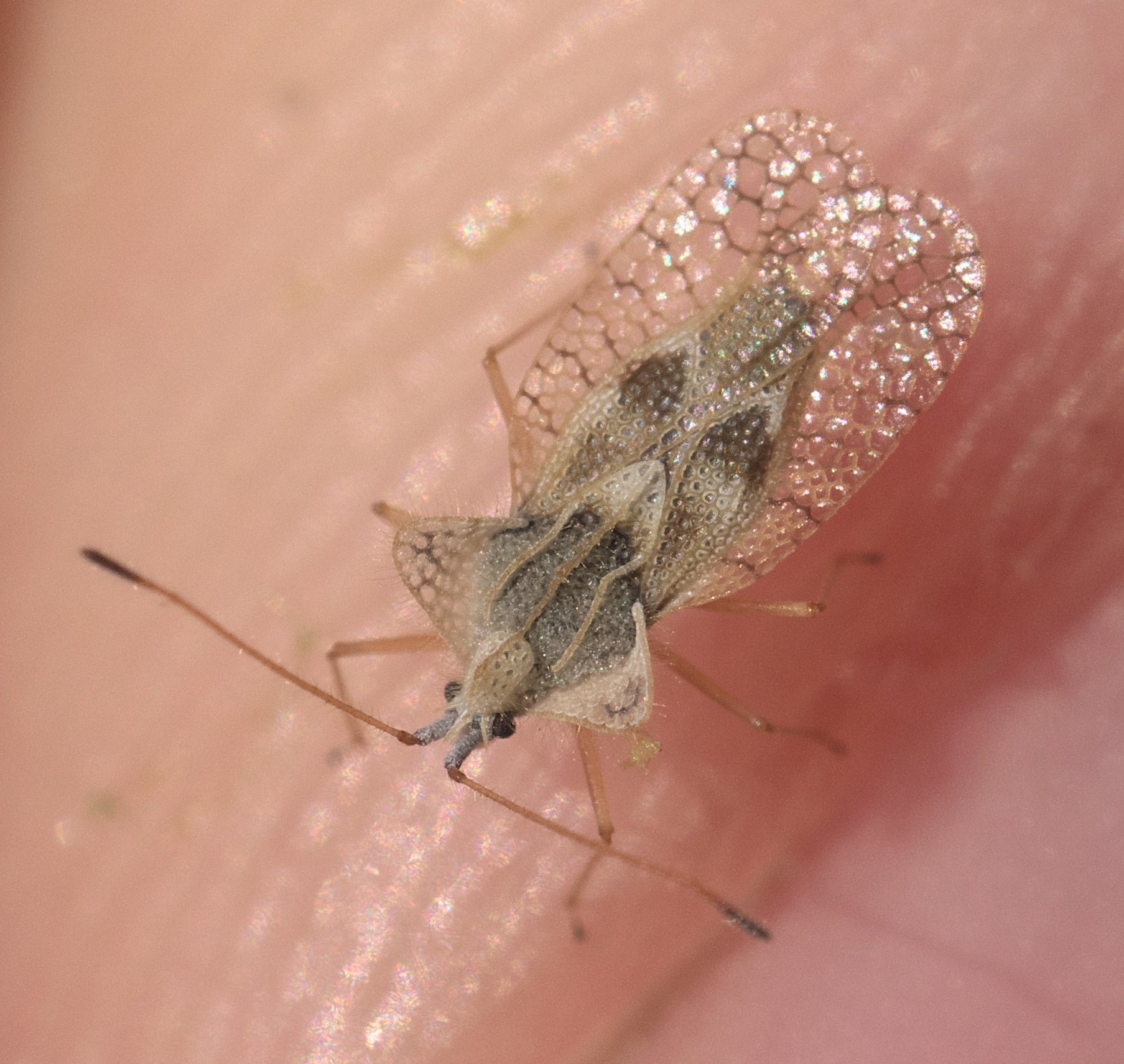
Gargaphia sp. – Oklahoma

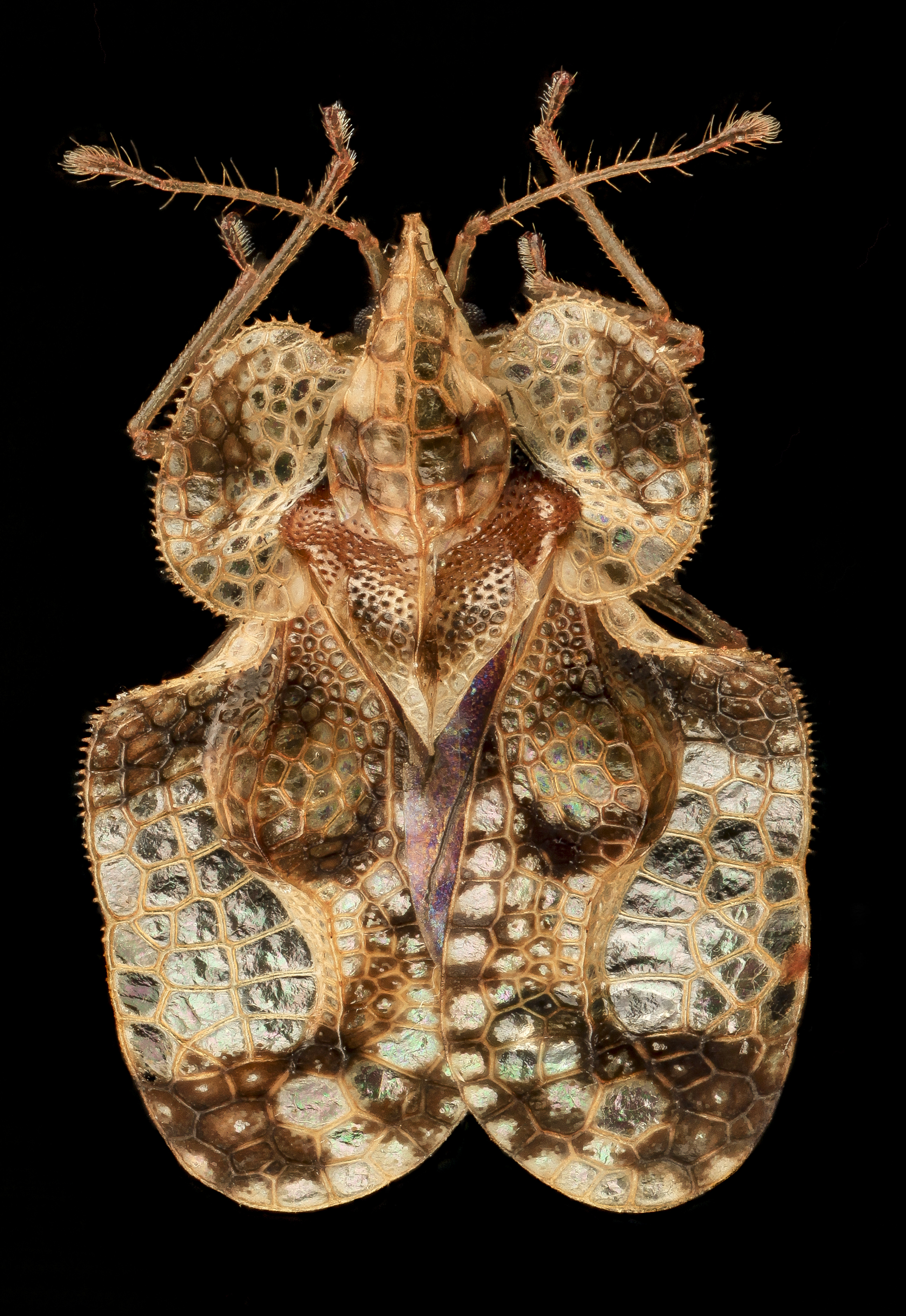
Tingidae – Maryland

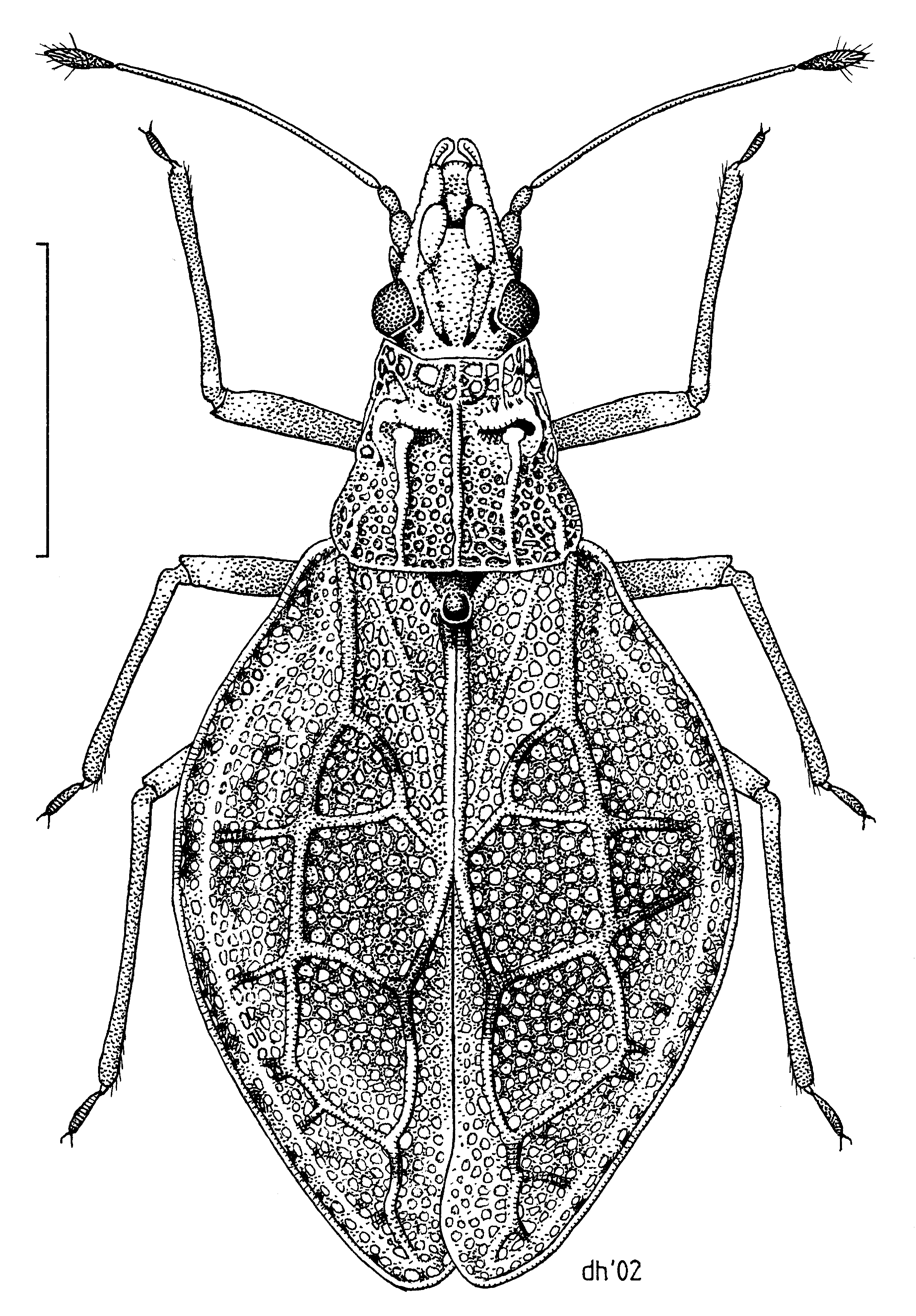
Cyperobia carectorum by Des Helmore – New Zealand

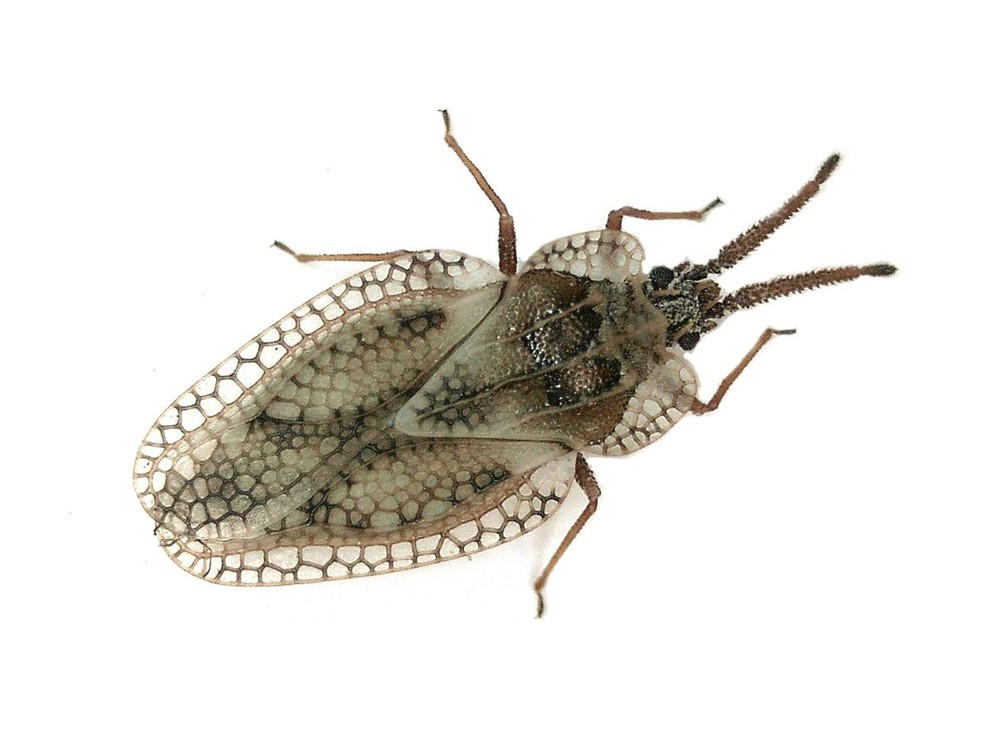
Dictyonota fuliginosa – Netherlands

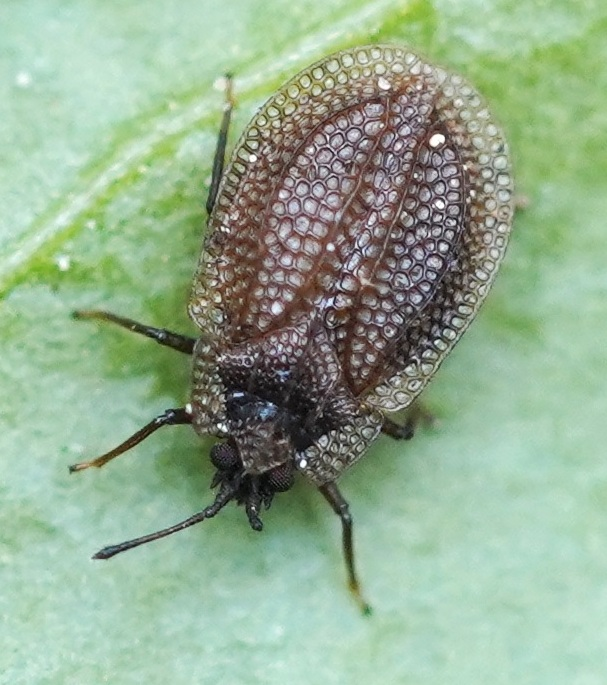
Acalypta carinata – Latvia

== See also ==
- Gargaphia solani – eggplant lacebug
- Stephanitis takeyai – andromeda lace bug
- †Leptopharsa tacanae - tingid from Mexican amber
