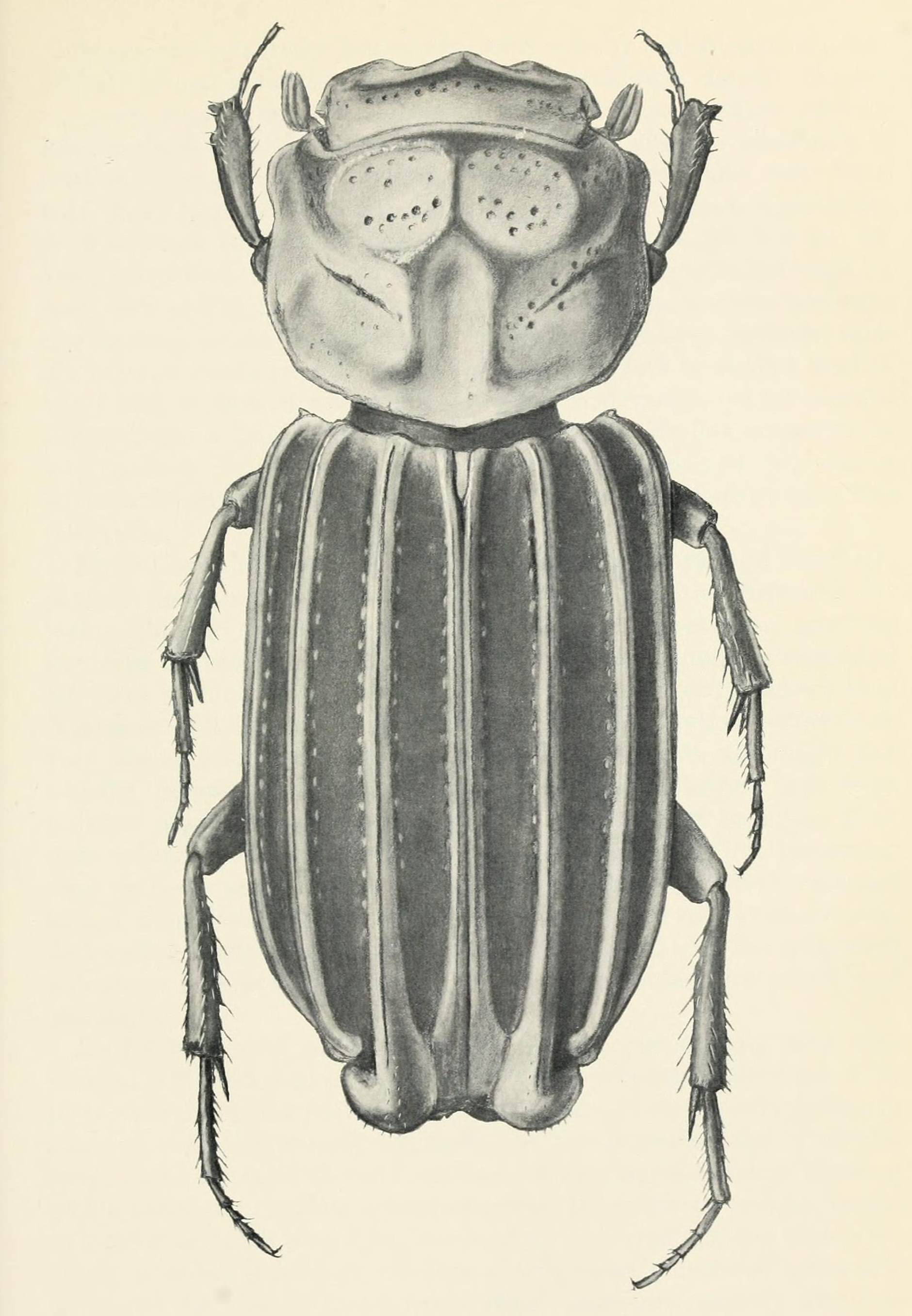
- C. intertribalis, illustrated by Elsie Herbold Froeschner

Scientific classification
- Kingdom: Animalia
- Phylum: Arthropoda
- Clade: Pancrustacea
- Class: Insecta
- Order: Coleoptera
- Suborder: Polyphaga
- Infraorder: Scarabaeiformia
- Family: Scarabaeidae
- Subfamily: Aphodiinae
- Genus: Cartwrightia; Islas, 1958

Type species
- Cartwrightia intertribalis Islas, 1958

Species
- C. cartwrighti Cartwright 1967; C. intertribalis Islas 1958; C. islasi Cartwright 1967

= Cartwrightia =

Genus of beetles

Cartwrightia is a genus of scarab found in Latin America. It was named and circumscribed in 1958 by Federico Islas Salas. As of 2017, three species are recognized: C. intertribalis, C. cartwrighti, and C. islasi. They can be found in the nests of leafcutter ants or in dung.

== Taxonomic history ==
The Mexican entomologist Federico Islas Salas circumscribed the genus Cartwrightia in 1959 for his newly-described species C. intertribalis. The generic name is in honor of the American entomologist Oscar Ling Cartwright. In 1967, Cartwright himself described two additional species in this genus: C. islasi, whose specific name honors Islas, and C. cartwrighti, which Cartwright named after his brother.

== Taxonomy ==
Cartwrightia is in the subfamily Aphodiinae of the scarab family Scarabaeidae, although entomologists are not all in agreement as to which tribe it should be placed in. American entomologist Paul E. Skelley has described this genus as "unusual", "distinct", and in need of additional study as to its taxonomic classification. Its characteristics are similar to those of various tribes, including: Eupariini, Odontolochini, and Rhyparini.

In 1967, Cartwright wrote this genus "superficially appears most closely allied to Rhyparus in the tribe Rhyparina", but placed this genus in the tribe Eupariina. Others who have placed it in Eupariina include the Italian entomologist Marco Dellacasa, the American entomologist Henry Fuller Howden and the Canadian-Australian entomologist Ross I. Storey, Skelley, and Mexican entomologist Pablo Minor.

Zdzisława Teresa Stebnicka and colleagues, however, disagreed with this, placing it in Rhyparini as the mouthparts and head shape exclude it from the tribe Eupariini. The Swedish entomologists Hege Vårdal and Mattias Forshage have also placed this genus in Rhyparini.

== Description ==
Beetles in this genus are 3–4 mm (0.12–0.16 in) long and have elongate, somewhat flat bodies which are rufous in color. They have elongated mesocoxa and their mesothorax lateral sclerites are hidden. This genus is also characterized by bulbous formations at the posterior tips of their elytra and depressions on their pronotum.

== Distribution ==
Cartwrightia are found in Mexico, Central America, and South America. C. intertribalis have been found in Mexico, C. islasi have been found in Mexico, Guatemala, and El Salvador, and C. cartwrighti are found throughout tropical South America.

== Biology ==
Cartwrightia species are myrmecophilous and ant inquilines. C. islasi have been found in the nest of the leafcutter ant Atta cephalotes. C. islasi and C. cartwrighti have also been found in dung.
