= Elsie Herbold Froeschner =

American scientific illustrator (1913–2006)

Mrs. Elsie M.L. Herbold Froeschner
- Born: October 6, 1913
- Died: September 12, 2006 (aged 92); Arlington County, Virginia, US
- Resting place: Arlington National Cemetery; 38.878325°N 77.068671°W
- Education: Kalamazoo College Class of 1935; University of Michigan Class of 1936
- Known for: Scientific illustration
- Spouse: Richard Froeschner (m. 1940; died 2002)

Elsie Herbold Froeschner (October 6, 1913 – September 12, 2006) was an American scientific illustrator best known for her ink drawings of insects belonging to the order Hemiptera. The insect genus Elsiella and insect species Froeschneriella elsiae are named in her honor.

== Biography ==
Elsie M.L. Herbold was born on October 6, 1913. After graduating from the University of Michigan with her master's degree, she married Richard Froeschner on October 6, 1940. The two were married for 62 years and had two daughters, Ellen and Kay. Their first daughter was born on February 23, 1944, and would eventually serve as a computer programmer in the US Army at the Panama Canal Zone and the Pentagon. Their second daughter, Kay, was born in 1948 – shortly before the family moved from Missouri to Cambridge, Massachusetts for several months so Richard could participate in research at the Museum of Comparative Zoology at Harvard University.

For her husband's seventieth birthday, Froeschner joined his friends and colleagues in writing a series of articles in his honor. The articles were published in Volume 94, Issue 2 of the Journal of the New York Entomological Society in April 1986, and many included admirable mentions of Froeschner. She was mentioned fondly in the section written by Richard's brothers, who said that her sketches had often appeared on their Christmas cards and that her paintings "have long graced the walls of friends and relatives fortunate to have received them." A scientific article published in the same issue expressed the author's admiration for Froeschner's friendly demeanor and unrivaled illustrations. An article written by one of Richard's students stressed that, "No mention of Dick Froeschner would be complete without a word about Elsie, her great good cheer, tremendous interest in life, and wondrous drawings and illustrations."

Froeschner died on September 12, 2006, at age 93 in Arlington, Virginia. She shares a space at Arlington National Cemetery with her husband who had died four years prior in 2002.

== Career ==
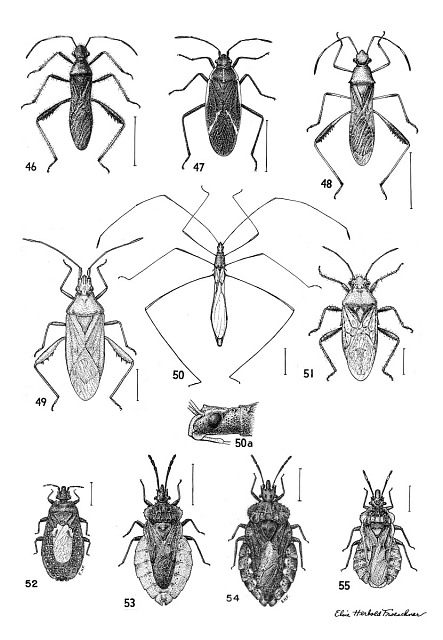
Various Hemiptera of Missouri, Elsie Froeschner, 1942

Froeschner graduated from Kalamazoo College with a Bachelor of Arts degree in biology in 1935. She immediately continued her education at the University of Michigan, earning a Master of Science degree in 1936.

Soon after her graduation from the University of Michigan, Froeschner returned home and began teaching zoology classes at Sweet Briar College in Sweet Briar, Virginia. From 1938 to 1941, she worked as a medical and scientific illustrator at the University of Missouri. She was head of research art in seven distinct departments, including the entomology department where she met her soon-to-be husband Richard Froeschner. Following her work at the university, Froeschner worked as the Missouri Botanical Garden's official botanical artist for several years she left traditional employment in 1948 to travel and work as a successful freelance artist for over a decade.

Froeschner became an entomological illustrator at the Smithsonian Institution's National Museum of Natural History in 1963, a position she held until 1975. Her illustrations were specifically mentioned for their excellence in the Smithsonian's 1969 annual published report. While working at the National Museum of Natural History in the fall of 1968, Froeschner attended several lunch meetings that eventually led to the creation of the Guild of Natural Science Illustrators in December of the same year. She is even included in a set of contemporaneous illustrated portraits depicting the organization's original set of founders. Froeschner was elected to the first board of directors for the Guild of Natural Science Illustrators in 1969. She served as the vice president of the board until 1970 when she was instead elected president, a position she held until 1973.

Froeschner contributed more than 120 ink drawings of Orthoptera found in Iowa to her husband's Master's thesis at Iowa State College between 1949 and 1951. After leaving the Smithsonian in 1975, Elsie worked as a freelance botanical illustrator and was able to dedicate the remainder of her career to travel and research with Richard.

== Works ==
Froeschner's work has been included in hundreds of scientific papers, identification guides and textbooks, beginning soon after she started work in the field. She travelled extensively with her husband for several decades across the United States and Central and South America. These journeys provided her with the opportunity to draw a vast array of plant and insect species that were native to a variety of different climates and locations. Her illustrations are still relied on for research, with organizations like the U.S. Army Corps of Engineers continuing to use her illustrations to educate others about plant identification. Iowa State University holds numerous original scientific drawings by Froeschner, as does the Smithsonian Institution.

Sometime before 1948, Froeschner completed a large mural of scientifically accurate medicinal plants for a pharmaceutical company in St. Louis, Missouri. The mural remained until at least 1988 but has since been removed or destroyed.

=== Illustrations ===
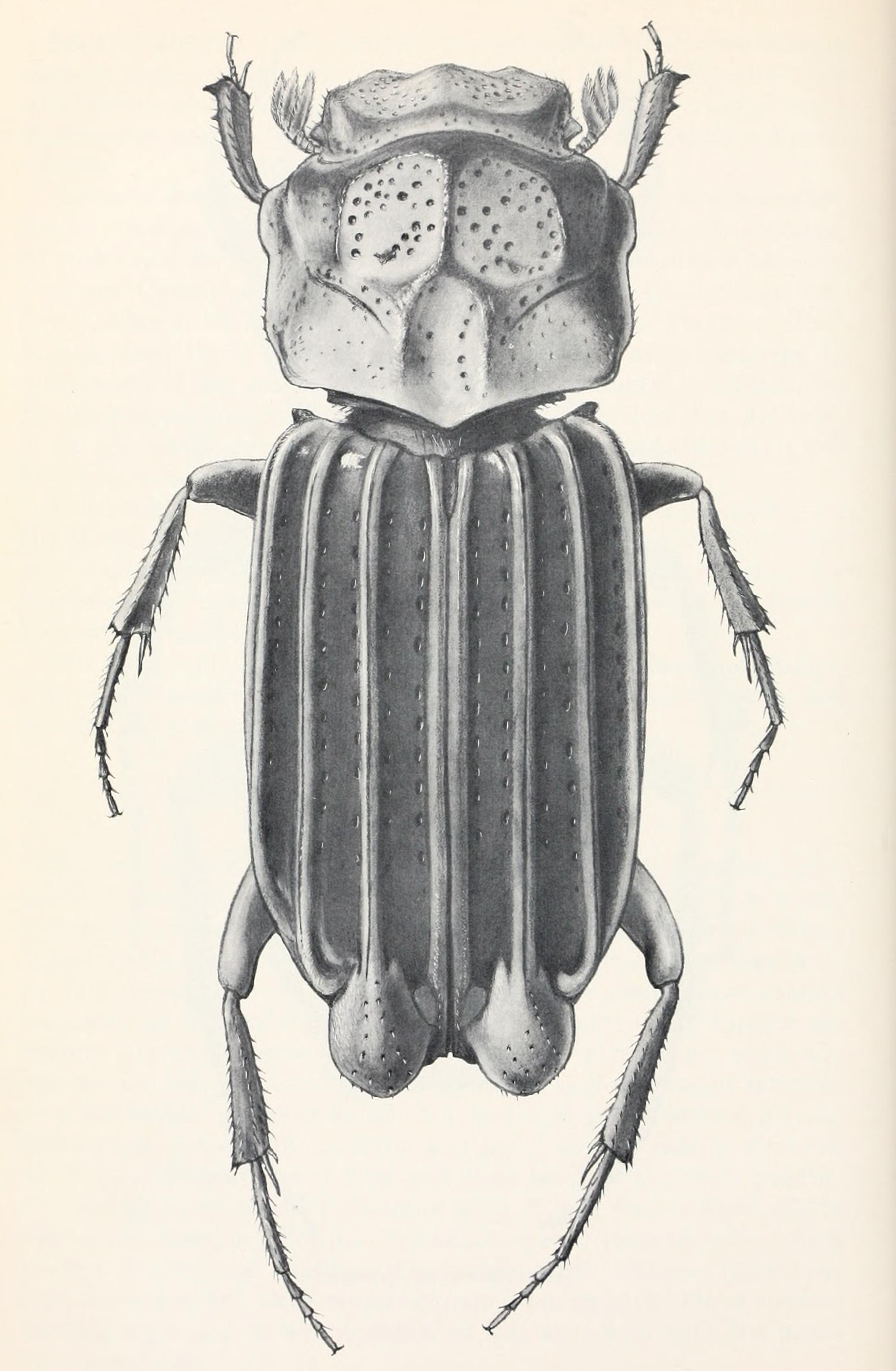
Cartwrightia cartwrighti, Smithsonian Institution, Elsie Froeschner, 1967

Through her work with her husband and the National Museum of Natural History, Froeschner was able to illustrate thousands of specimens. Her portfolio included the first scientific illustrations of numerous newly discovered insects and plants, including several new species of Cartwrightia and Corythucha. The Smithsonian Institution's Department of Entomology holds Froeschner illustrations of more than 300 distinct insect species.

A small selection of the hundreds of insect species known to have been illustrated by Froeschner include:

- Stephanitis pyrioides, 1944.
- Apiomerus crassipes, 1944.
- Corythucha serta, 1945.
- Cartwrightia islasi, 1967.
- Cartwrightia cartwrighti, 1967.
- Cartwrightia interiribalis, 1967.
- Corythucha gossypii, 1968.
- Elsiella plana, 1981.
- Froeschneriella elsiae, 1986.
- Arhaphe carolina, 1988.

=== Publications ===
Throughout the 1950s and 60s, she contributed numerous illustrations to the Iowa State Journal of Science and the botanical edition of Fieldiana, a publication of the Field Museum of Natural History in Chicago.

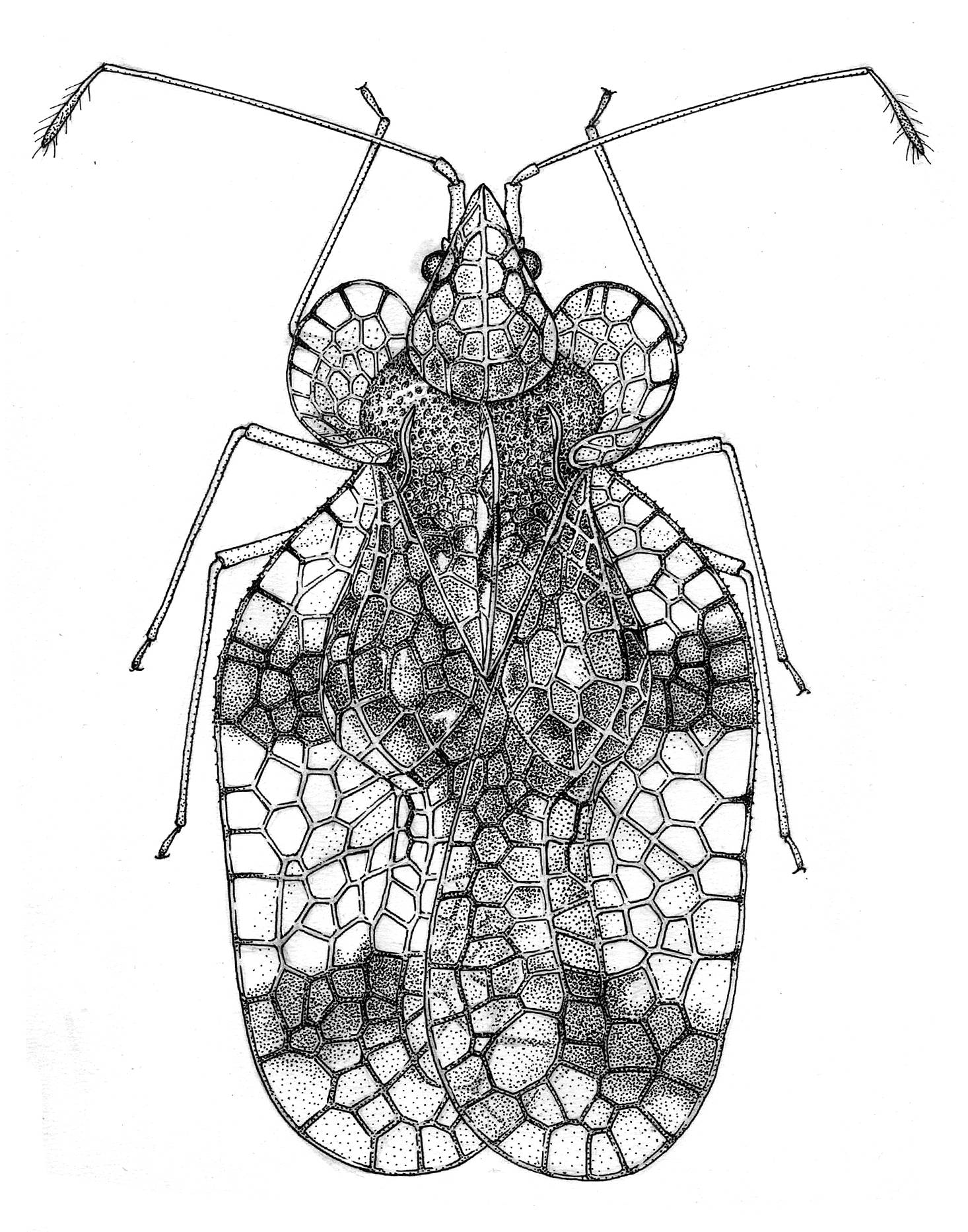
Stephanitis pyrioides, National Museum of Natural History, Elsie Froeschner, 1944

A selection of publications that rely on Froescher's illustrations:

- Contributions to a Synopsis of the Hemiptera of Missouri, R. Froeschner, 1944.
- Representative Missouri weeds and their control, Drew and Helm, 1946.
- Orchids of Guatemala, Ames and Correll, 1952
- Pacific Insects, 1962
- Lacebugs from New Guinea, Borneo, Solomons, and other islands of the South Pacific and Indian Oceans, Drake and Ruhoff, 1965.
- Indian Ocean Kinorhyncha, Higgins, 1969.
- Readings in Mammalogy, Anderson and Jones, 1970
- Citrate Octopods with Associated Deep-Sea Organisms, Roper and Brundage, 1972.
- Smithsonian Contributions to Zoology, Smithsonian Institution, 1973.
- Orchids of Guatemala and Belize, Ames and Correll, 1985

Froeschner's work continues to be included in dozens of modern field guides, textbooks, journals and theses. Her work regularly appears in both technical papers written for scientific professionals and field guides written to assist the amateur outdoorsman in plant identification. Recent publications that feature her illustrations include Biology of the Plant Bugs (2001), Assassin Bugs of Virginia (2006), Encyclopedia of Entomology (2008), Field Guide to Wisconsin Grasses (2014), and Insect Biodiversity: Science and Society (2017).

=== Academic writing ===
Froescher is credited as one of the authors of The Guild Handbook of Scientific Illustration, published first in 1988 and again in 2003. The book contains more than six hundred pages and thirty-five chapters, two of which were written by Froescher. Both of her sections were written on art techniques, chiefly emphasizing the value of carbon dust to scientific illustrators. She also contributed multiple example images and research to the publication.

While working at the Smithsonian, Froeschner studied two specimens from Peruvian Incans who had experienced trephination. Recalling her research decades later, Froeschner published a paper in the Journal of Neurosurgery about her observations of ancient skull surgery in 1992. Reproductions of her carbon dust and watercolor studies of the skulls can be found on page 152 of The Guild Handbook of Scientific Illustration.

== Legacy ==
In 1988, Froeschner was awarded the Distinguished Achievement Award by Kalamazoo College. This award is given annually to an alumnus who has achieved excellence and recognition in their field or profession. Kalamazoo College also awarded Froeschner with the Emerti Club Citation of Merit in 1997 in recognition of her continued involvement with and dedication to the school.

In 1996, the Guild of Natural Science Illustrators awarded Froeschner and several other early members with Founders' Awards in recognition of their efforts in the creation of the organization.

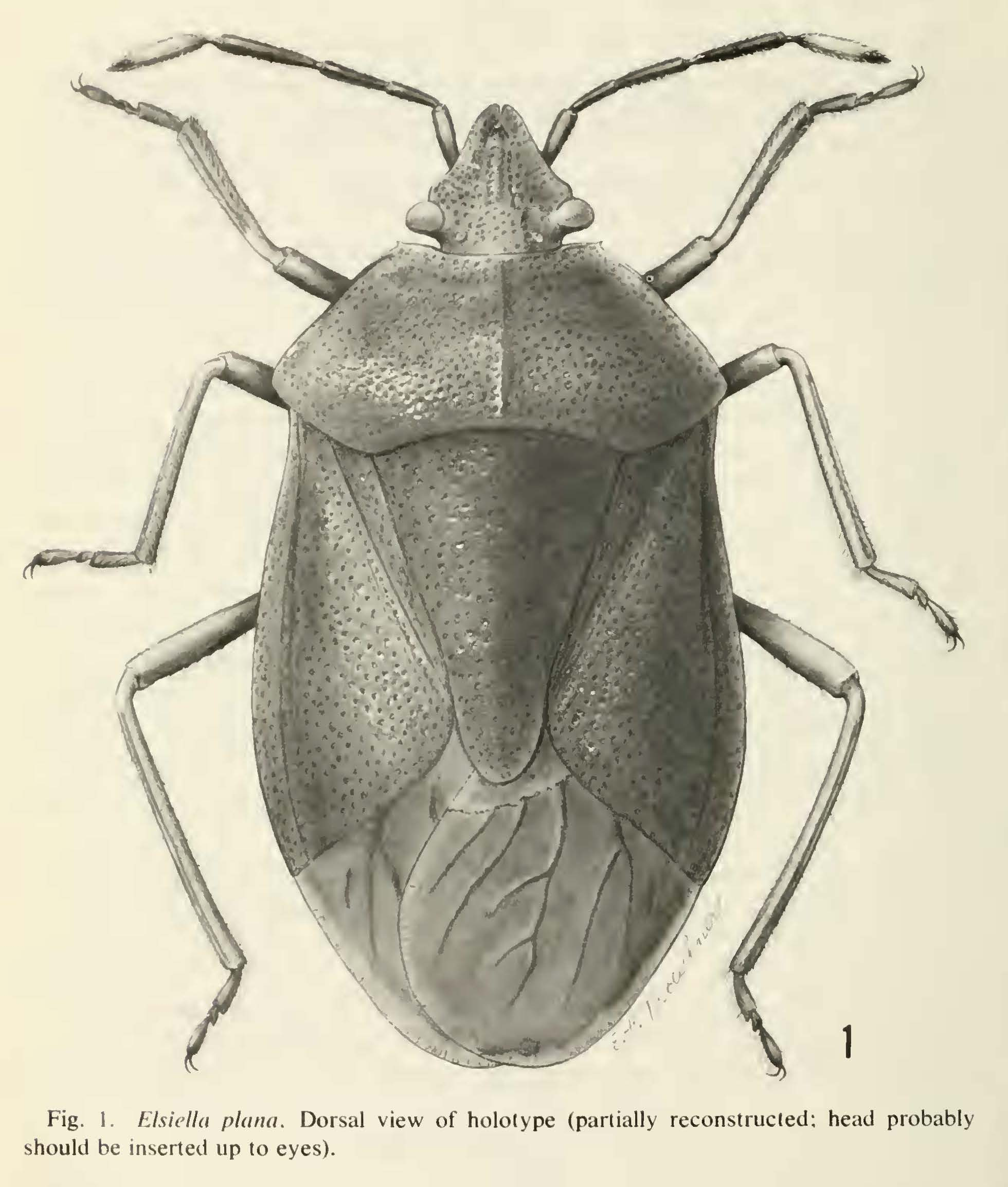
Elsiella plana, Elsie Froeschner, 1981

=== Elsiella ===
While working for the Smithsonian's Department of Entomology in 1981, Richard Froeschner proposed a new genus for a species of Ecuadorian insects then known as Ebora plana. Through collaboration with the Natural History Museum in London, Richard discovered data that had originally been omitted from study on the species. After determining that the insects known as Ebora plana could not belong to the genus Ebora or the closely related genus Serdia, Froeschner suggested the creation of a new monotypic genus which he called Elsiella. In the publication that announced his research, Richard stated the following:

This genus is named for my wife, Elsie Herbold Froeschner, whose more than 40 years of companionship, knowledge of science, artistic abilities, and sympathetic understanding of systematic entomology have made my life and my works better than they could have been without her.

— Richard Charles Froeschner, Elsiella, a new genus for Ebora Plana Walker (Hemiptera: Pentatomidae)

The genus is still known as Elsiella Froeschner, 1981 (Pentatominae: Pentatomini) today. There have only been a handful of confirmed sightings of its sole species Elsiella plana since it was first identified, all of which have been on the northern coast of South America in Ecuador and Colombia. A 2012 article published in Zootaxa provided new research that confirmed the validity of Elsiella as a genus by comparing newly found specimens to more than 40 similar species.

=== Froeschneriella elsiae ===
Jose C.M. Carvalho, a research fellow at the National Museum of Natural History working in Rio de Janeiro, published a paper that detailed his identification of several new members of the Miridae family in 1986. The paper included descriptions and illustrations of a new genus, Froeschneriella, and two new species: Froeschneriella elsiae and Proba froeschneri, all named for Elsie and Richard Froeschner. Carvalho had worked with Richard at Iowa State University and the pair's families quickly became friends, with Froeschner providing the illustrations for many of José's papers. Carvalho dedicated the species to Froeschner "in recognition of her illustrative work on numerous insects, including many hemipteran species."
