= Cartwrightia cartwrighti =

Scientific classification
- Kingdom: Animalia
- Phylum: Arthropoda
- Clade: Pancrustacea
- Class: Insecta
- Order: Coleoptera
- Suborder: Polyphaga
- Infraorder: Scarabaeiformia
- Family: Scarabaeidae
- Genus: Cartwrightia
- Species: C. cartwrighti

Binomial name
- Cartwrightia cartwrighti Cartwright, 1967

Species of beetle

Cartwrightia cartwrighti is a species of aphodiine scarab found in South America. Oscar L. Cartwright named the species in 1967 after his brother. C. cartwrighti has been recorded in cow dung in pastures and forests.

== Description ==
Males are roughly 3.0 mm (0.12 in) long and 1.25 mm (0.049 in) wide; females are 3.5 mm (0.14 in) long and 1.4 mm (0.055 in) wide. The anterior pronotal ridges are narrow and sharply carinate. There are smooth black intervals on the elytra, but otherwise there is a grayish-brown clay-like covering, including on the underside.

== Taxonomic history and etymology ==
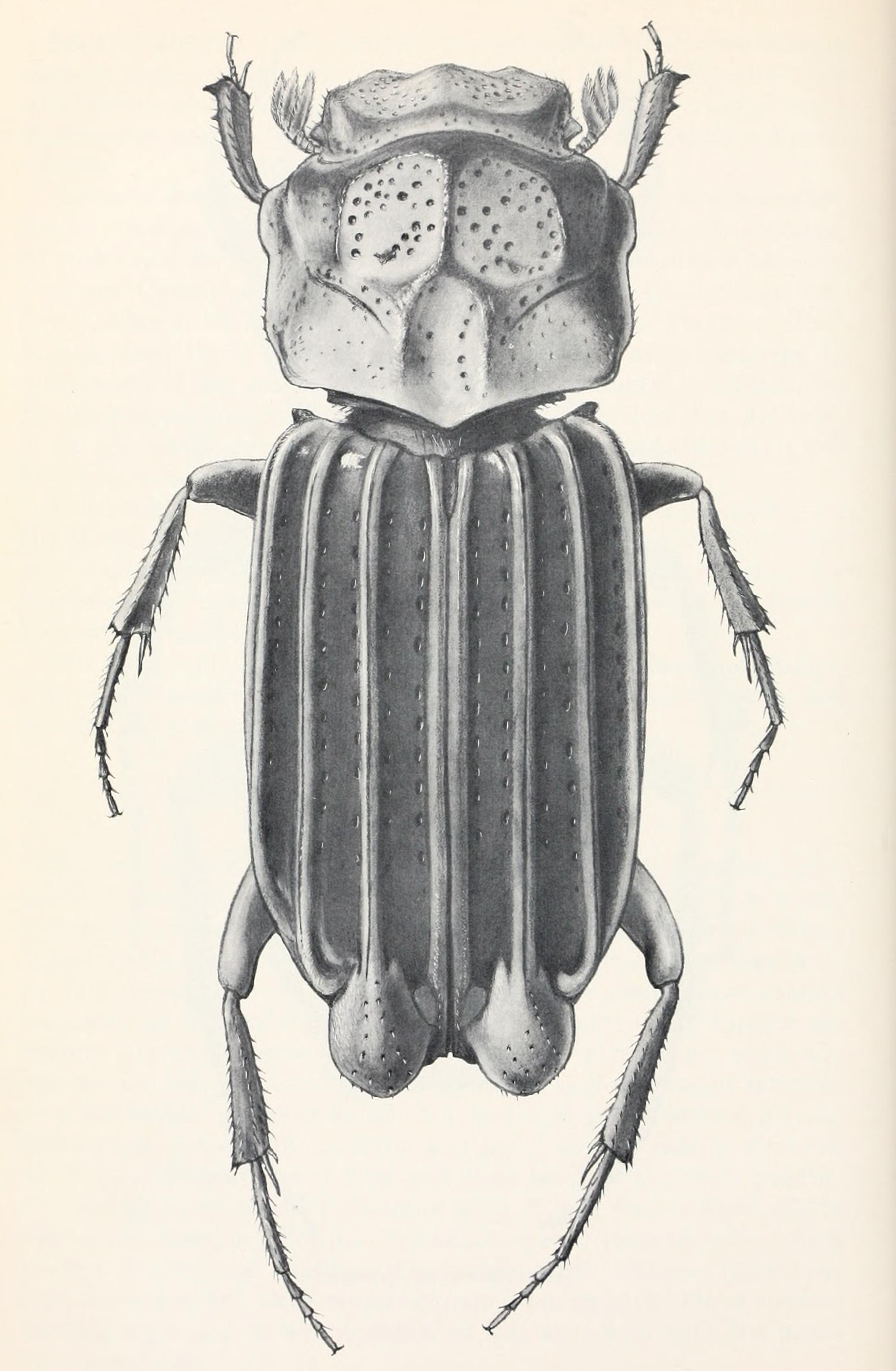
Illustration by Elsie Herbold Froeschner accompanying Cartwright's description

The American entomologist Oscar L. Cartwright wrote the species description for C. cartwrighti in 1967. He placed it in the genus Cartwrightia which the Mexican entomologist Federico Islas Salas had named after him nine years earlier. Cartwright used three specimens to write his description: a male holotype and two female paratypes. (Note: One female paratype was designated an allotype, but the International Code of Zoological Nomenclature does not recognize "allotypes" as a category distinct from paratypes.) All three specimens were collected with a blacklight insect trap in early January 1960.

Cartwright named this species after his brother Raymond Kenneth Cartwright. He was not an entomologist but accompanied Cartwright on several of his collecting expeditions. Cartwright's colleague at the National Museum of Natural History Paul J. Spangler wrote Cartwright named this species "with tongue and cheek and the usual twinkle in his eye" and that this name led him to be "subjected to considerable kidding". Elsie Herbold Froeschner's illustration of C. cartwrighti which accompanied Cartwright's original description was used as a logo for the invitation to Cartwright's retirement party; there he was gifted a set of stationery which was decorated with the same image.

The name Cartwrightia cartwrighti Cartwright is the only scientific name where the genus, species, and author names form a sequence using successive subtraction of the last letter to form the next word.

== Distribution and Biology ==
C. cartwrighti is found in tropical South America. Its type locality, where the holotype and paratypes were collected, is the Saavedra Experiment Station, 60 miles (97 km) north of Santa Cruz de la Sierra in eastern Bolivia. This is at the edge of the Amazon basin near the Gran Chaco. It has been subsequently found in the Bolivian town of San Ramón, Santa Cruz, in Mata dos Godoy State Park in the state of Paraná in southern Brazil, and in Presidencia de la Plaza, Chaco Province in northern Argentina. The studies in Presidencia de la Plaza and San Ramón found C. cartwrighti in cow dung, but only in forests but not in nearby pastures, while the study in Paraná found specimens only in pastures but not in nearby forests.
