= Rhyparus approximans =

Scientific classification
- Kingdom: Animalia
- Phylum: Arthropoda
- Clade: Pancrustacea
- Class: Insecta
- Order: Coleoptera
- Suborder: Polyphaga
- Infraorder: Scarabaeiformia
- Family: Scarabaeidae
- Genus: Rhyparus
- Species: R. approximans

Binomial name
- Rhyparus approximans Fairmaire, 1893

Species of beetle

Rhyparus approximans is a species of beetle of the family Scarabaeidae. It is found in Indonesia (Kalimantan) and Malaysia (Sabah).

== Description ==
Adults reach a length of about 5.5–6 mm (0.22–0.24 in). They have an elongate, parallel-sided, slightly shiny, black body, with dark brown legs.
