= Rhyparus chinensis =

Scientific classification
- Kingdom: Animalia
- Phylum: Arthropoda
- Clade: Pancrustacea
- Class: Insecta
- Order: Coleoptera
- Suborder: Polyphaga
- Infraorder: Scarabaeiformia
- Family: Scarabaeidae
- Genus: Rhyparus
- Species: R. chinensis

Binomial name
- Rhyparus chinensis Balthasar, 1952

Species of beetle

Rhyparus chinensis is a species of beetle of the family Scarabaeidae. It is found in China (Fujian).

== Description ==
Adults reach a length of about 5–6 mm (0.20–0.24 in). They have an almost parallel-sided, quite shiny, black body.
