= Termitodius =

Scientific classification
- Kingdom: Animalia
- Phylum: Arthropoda
- Clade: Pancrustacea
- Class: Insecta
- Order: Coleoptera
- Suborder: Polyphaga
- Infraorder: Scarabaeiformia
- Family: Scarabaeidae
- Subfamily: Aphodiinae
- Tribe: Rhyparini
- Genus: Termitodius; Wasmann, 1894

Genus of beetles

Termitodius is a genus of beetles of the family Scarabaeidae.

== Species ==
- Termitodius araujoi Reyes & Martinez, 1979
- Termitodius chaki Reyes & Martinez, 1979
- Termitodius coronatus Wasmann, 1894
- Termitodius woodruffi Skelley, Clavijo-Bustos & Keller, 2022
