= Apiomerus pilipes =

Scientific classification
- Kingdom: Animalia
- Phylum: Arthropoda
- Class: Insecta
- Order: Hemiptera
- Suborder: Heteroptera
- Family: Reduviidae
- Genus: Apiomerus
- Species: A. pilipes

Binomial name
- Apiomerus pilipes (Fabricius, 1787)

Species of true bug

Apiomerus pilipes, the bee assassin, is an insect that feeds on bees. It is found in South America and reported from Venezuela, Colombia, French Guiana, and Brazil. Like other members of the genus, females of this species have well-developed hind abdominal foliaceous appendages which can be coated with plant-derived resin.

This species has been documented to prey upon meliponine bees (stingless bees), including Melipona compressipes and M. seminigra. Usually, the bee assassin kills the prey species quickly (within 6–8 seconds).
