= Sybacodes lutulentus =

Scientific classification
- Kingdom: Animalia
- Phylum: Arthropoda
- Clade: Pancrustacea
- Class: Insecta
- Order: Coleoptera
- Suborder: Polyphaga
- Infraorder: Scarabaeiformia
- Family: Scarabaeidae
- Genus: Sybacodes
- Species: S. lutulentus

Binomial name
- Sybacodes lutulentus Fairmaire, 1896

Species of beetle

Sybacodes lutulentus is a species of beetle of the family Scarabaeidae. It is found in Nepal, India, Myanmar, Thailand and Vietnam.

== Description ==
Adults reach a length of about 6–7 mm (0.24–0.28 in). They have an oblong-oval, convex, dull, blackish-brown body, usually covered with a greyish-brown coating. The upper surface has some short, yellow hairs.

== Subspecies ==
- Sybacodes lutulentus lutulentus (India, Myanmar, Thailand, Vietnam)
- Sybacodes lutulentus alternatus Fairmaire, 1897 (Myanmar, Nepal, India: Assam)
