= Rhyparus azumai =

Scientific classification
- Kingdom: Animalia
- Phylum: Arthropoda
- Clade: Pancrustacea
- Class: Insecta
- Order: Coleoptera
- Suborder: Polyphaga
- Infraorder: Scarabaeiformia
- Family: Scarabaeidae
- Genus: Rhyparus
- Species: R. azumai

Binomial name
- Rhyparus azumai Nakane, 1956

Species of beetle

Rhyparus azumai is a species of beetle of the family Scarabaeidae. It is found in Japan, Taiwan and possibly Korea.

== Description ==
Adults reach a length of about 5–5.5 mm (0.20–0.22 in). They have an elongate, nearly parallel-sided, slightly glossy, blackish-brown to black body, with reddish-brown legs.
