= Richard Froeschner =

American entomologist

Richard Charles Froeschner (March 8, 1916 – May 2, 2002) was an American entomologist. He was born in Chicago, Illinois. He married Elsie Herbold Froeschner, a scientific illustrator, on October 6, 1940. He attended the University of Missouri in Columbia, Missouri, and earned a M.S. and Ph.D. from Iowa State College, under mirid bug specialist Harry H. Knight.

He was an assistant/associate professor at Montana State College from 1954 to 1960, when he briefly took a position with the USDA Division of Insect Identification in Washington DC, then returned to Missoula. He came back to DC as a U.S. National Museum research entomologist for the Smithsonian in 1963, where he worked until retirement in 1995. He remained active in Heteroptera research until 2001. During his career,Dick Froeschner published 131 entomological papers, mostly on Heteroptera, and treated taxa in 10 families and two suborders, describing new to science two subfamilies, eight genera, and 111 species.

His works on insects included:

- Heteroptera or True Bugs of Ecuador: A Partial Catalog. Smithsonian Contributions to Zoology. Vol. 322. 1981. doi:10.5479/si.00810282.322.
- Lace Bug Genera of the World, I: Introduction, Subfamily Cantacaderinae (Heteroptera: Tingidae). Smithsonian Contributions to Zoology. Vol. 574. 1996. pp. 1–43. doi:10.5479/si.00810282.574.
- Synopsis of the Heteroptera or True Bugs of the Galápagos Islands. Smithsonian Contributions to Zoology. Vol. 407. 1985. doi:10.5479/si.00810282.407.
- True Bugs (Heteroptera) of Panama: A Synoptic Catalog as a Contribution to the Study of Panamanian Biodiversity. Memoirs of the American Entomological Institute. Vol. 61. 1999. ISBN 1-887988-05-X.
- Lace Bug Genera of the World, II: Subfamily Tinginae: Tribes Litadeini and Ypsotingini (Heteroptera: Tingidae). Smithsonian Contributions to Zoology. Vol. 611. 2001. pp. 1–28. doi:10.5479/si.00810282.611.

== Legacy ==
Taxa named in his honor include:

- Froeschneriella Carvalho, 1986
- Froeschnerisca Coscarón, 1997
  - (Replacement name for Froeschneriella Coscarón, 1996)
- Froeschneropsidea Henry & Ferreira, 2005
  - (Replacement name for Froeschnerisca Henry & Ferreira, 2003)
