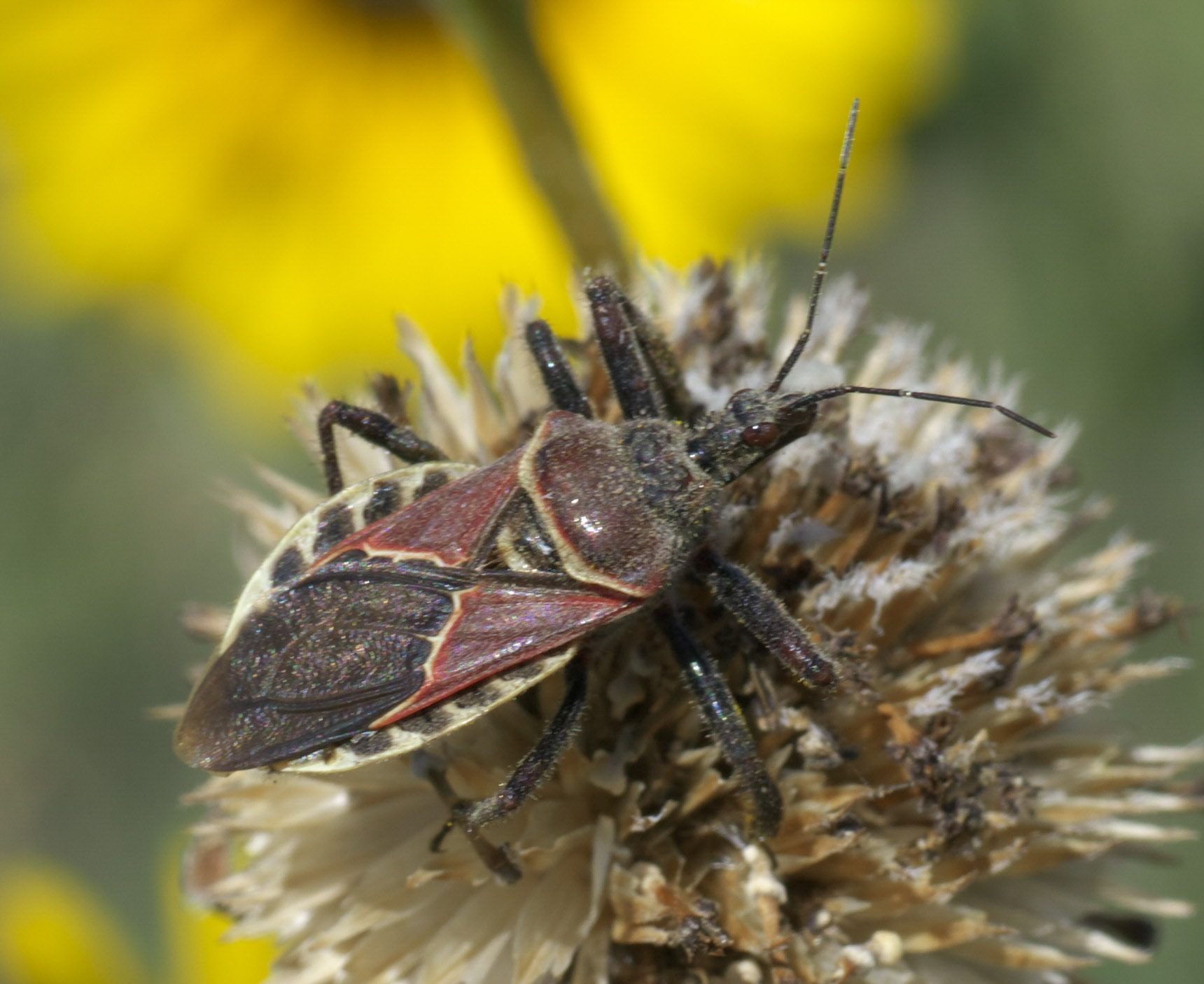

Scientific classification
- Domain: Eukaryota
- Kingdom: Animalia
- Phylum: Arthropoda
- Class: Insecta
- Order: Hemiptera
- Suborder: Heteroptera
- Family: Reduviidae
- Genus: Apiomerus
- Species: A. spissipes

Binomial name
- Apiomerus spissipes (Say, 1825)

= Apiomerus spissipes =

Species of true bug

Apiomerus spissipes is a species of assassin bug in the family Reduviidae. It is found in Central America and North America.
