= Rhyparus peninsularis =

Scientific classification
- Kingdom: Animalia
- Phylum: Arthropoda
- Clade: Pancrustacea
- Class: Insecta
- Order: Coleoptera
- Suborder: Polyphaga
- Infraorder: Scarabaeiformia
- Family: Scarabaeidae
- Genus: Rhyparus
- Species: R. peninsularis

Binomial name
- Rhyparus peninsularis Arrow, 1905

Species of beetle

Rhyparus peninsularis is a species of beetle of the family Scarabaeidae. It is found in Malaysia (Sabah, Malacca), the Philippines (Leyte), Bhutan and Taiwan.

== Description ==
Adults reach a length of about 6–7 mm (0.24–0.28 in). They have a dull, black body, with a greyish-brown coating.
