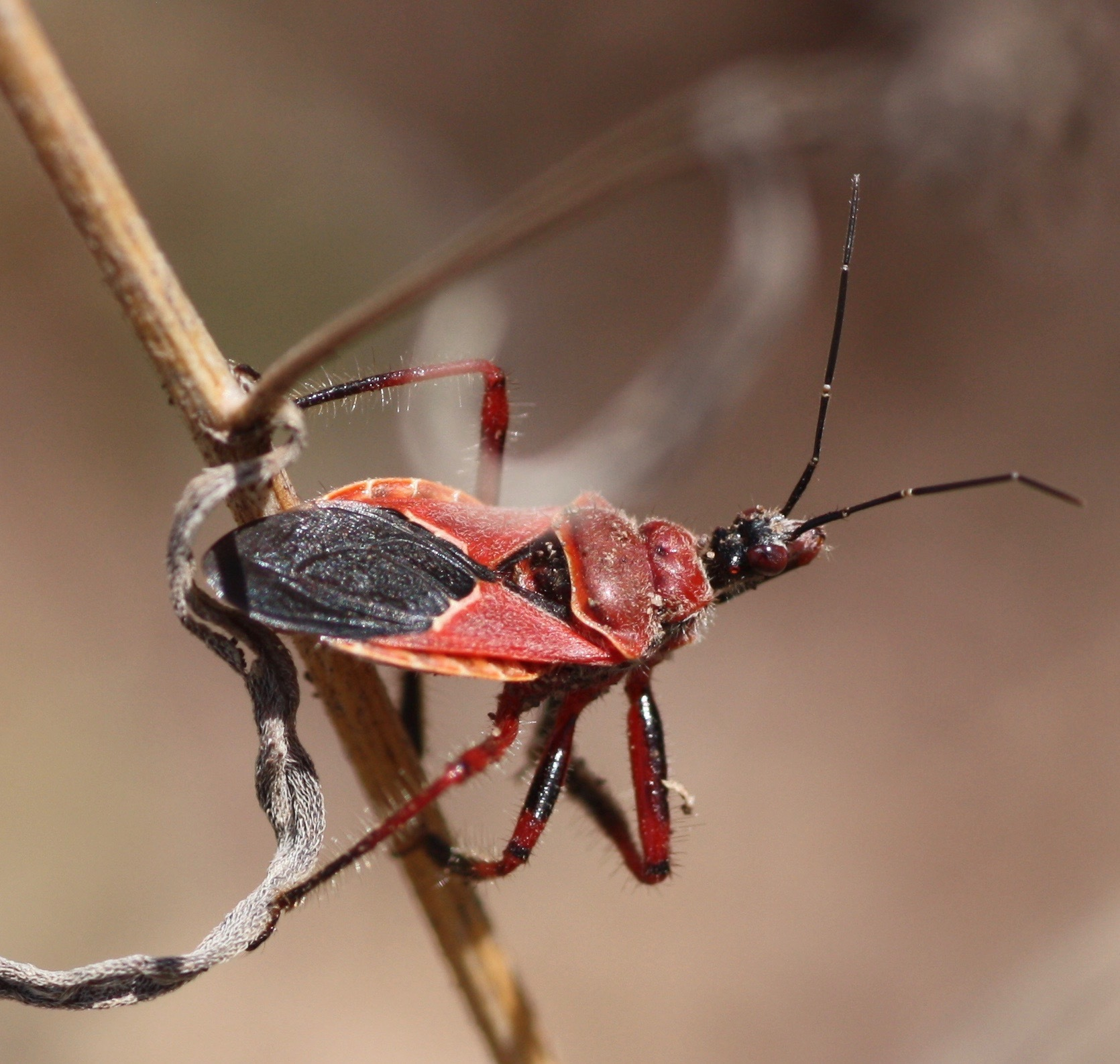

Scientific classification
- Domain: Eukaryota
- Kingdom: Animalia
- Phylum: Arthropoda
- Class: Insecta
- Order: Hemiptera
- Suborder: Heteroptera
- Family: Reduviidae
- Genus: Apiomerus
- Species: A. cazieri

Binomial name
- Apiomerus cazieri Berniker & Szerlip, 2011

= Apiomerus cazieri =

Species of bug

Apiomerus cazieri is a species of assassin bug found in the Chihuahuan and Sonoran Deserts of the southwestern United States and northern Mexico. It is a known predator of Trichodes ornatus, as well as honey bees.
