= Rhyparus obsoletus =

Scientific classification
- Kingdom: Animalia
- Phylum: Arthropoda
- Clade: Pancrustacea
- Class: Insecta
- Order: Coleoptera
- Suborder: Polyphaga
- Infraorder: Scarabaeiformia
- Family: Scarabaeidae
- Genus: Rhyparus
- Species: R. obsoletus

Binomial name
- Rhyparus obsoletus Fairmaire, 1893

Species of beetle

Rhyparus obsoletus is a species of beetle of the family Scarabaeidae. It is found in Indonesia (Sumatra).

== Description ==
Adults reach a length of about 5 mm (0.20 in). They have a slightly shiny, black body, which is slightly widened towards the rear.
