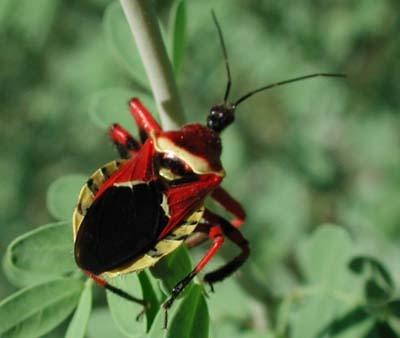
- Apiomerus spissipes

Scientific classification
- Kingdom: Animalia
- Phylum: Arthropoda
- Clade: Pancrustacea
- Class: Insecta
- Order: Hemiptera
- Suborder: Heteroptera
- Family: Reduviidae
- Tribe: Apiomerini
- Genus: Apiomerus; Hahn, 1831

= Apiomerus =

Genus of true bugs

Apiomerus is a genus of conspicuous, brightly colored assassin bugs belonging to the family Reduviidae. The common name bee assassins originates from their foraging habits as ambush predators around flowers targeting a variety of bees. The bright colors function as aposematic signals, warning larger predators for its potential to deliver a painful bite if disturbed.

== Distribution ==
As a New World genus, Apiomerus is found across the Americas. Its range stretches from the United States ranging into tropical America.

Southwestern states feature the highest diversity of Apiomerus within the United States.

== Morphology ==
Members of Apiomerus are well built, brightly coloured assassin bugs. They are often glossy in appearance with a thickened pronotum.

The legs feature several attributes that aid in the manipulation of plant resin. The foretibia and mesotibia are covered with short hairs to form a dense tibial comb. The hindleg also features a metatibial comb that allows transfer of plant resin onto other surfaces. The comb is present in all females within the genus, which use it to apply the collected resin onto egg masses post oviposition. The genus is sexually dimorphic with the density of setae on the ventroapical segment lost in male individuals. Ancestral state reconstruction suggests the metatibital comb to be a basal ancestral trait for Apiomerus. While males do not necessarily require the metatibial comb for further resin transfer, the trait may remain in both sexes for its dual function of prey handling.

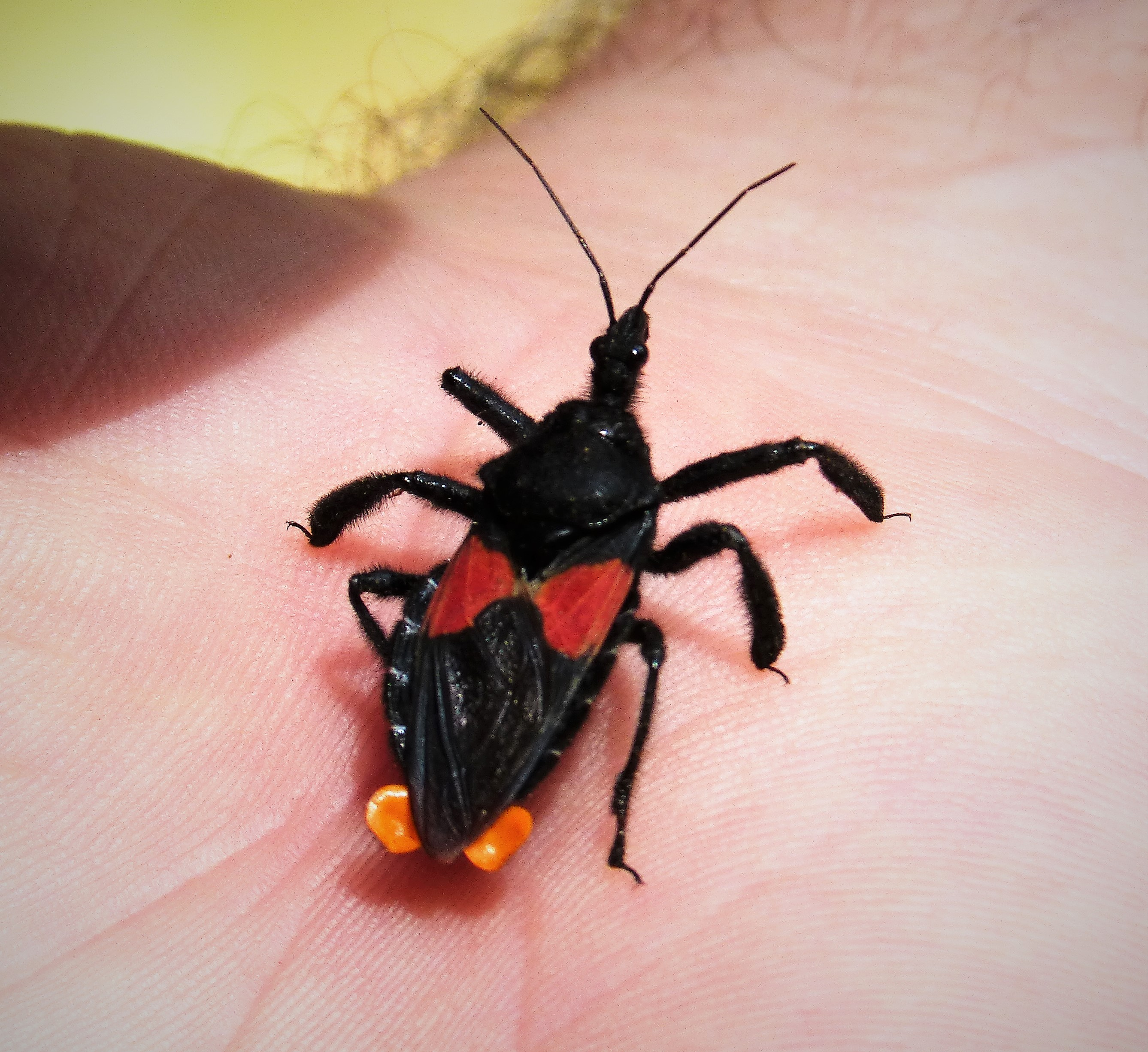
Apiomerus sp. with exaggerated tergite

Some members feature distinctively larger and brightly coloured lobes on tergite 7 ~ 8. While initially thought to be a distractive element to mislead predator strikes, insignificant evidence from museum collections point toward them to be elaborate structures for courtship display.

Apiomerus exhibits significant diversity in genital morphology with complex abdominal sclerite constructions in both sexes. This variety is unique to the genus and is hypothesized to correlate with the species richness within the clade. It may serve as evidence for sexual selection acting as the primary driver of extreme speciation within the genus.

Some members are highly polychromatic with strong variation within the same species, regardless of sex and geographic distribution.

== Taxonomy ==
Apiomerus is the largest clade within the monophyletic tribe Apiomerini. Frequent variations in a variety of colour morphs across species have often been revealed as synonyms with many species left at a species group level, with the crassipes and pictipes species group combined containing 12 different species. However, recent phylogenetic and morphological analyses presented genital morphology as a reliable method to differentiate to species level.

== Behaviour ==
=== Resin collection ===
The use of resin as 'sticky traps' to aid in prey capture is prevalent within members of Apiomerini, including Apiomerus. Individuals will collect plant sap from a range of plants, including brittlebrush (Asteraceae) and Andean blackberry (Rosaceae).

The sap is collected by scraping the plant surface with its forelegs, picking up exuding material into the comblike setae. In females, the resin is transferred onto the mesotibia, then onto the metatibial comb. The comb finally stores the resin in a dense patch of ventral setae until further use. Certain species feature ventral glands that may interact with the stored resin, preventing it from hardening before application. This behaviour is prevalent in all life stages. Adult females have shown behaviour resembling harvesting leftover resin from its exuviae post moulting. Adult males have not been documented to store resin beyond scraping it onto the foretibiae. Early nymphal stages actively collect sap from the environment in a similar fashion.

==== Prey capture and sticky traps ====
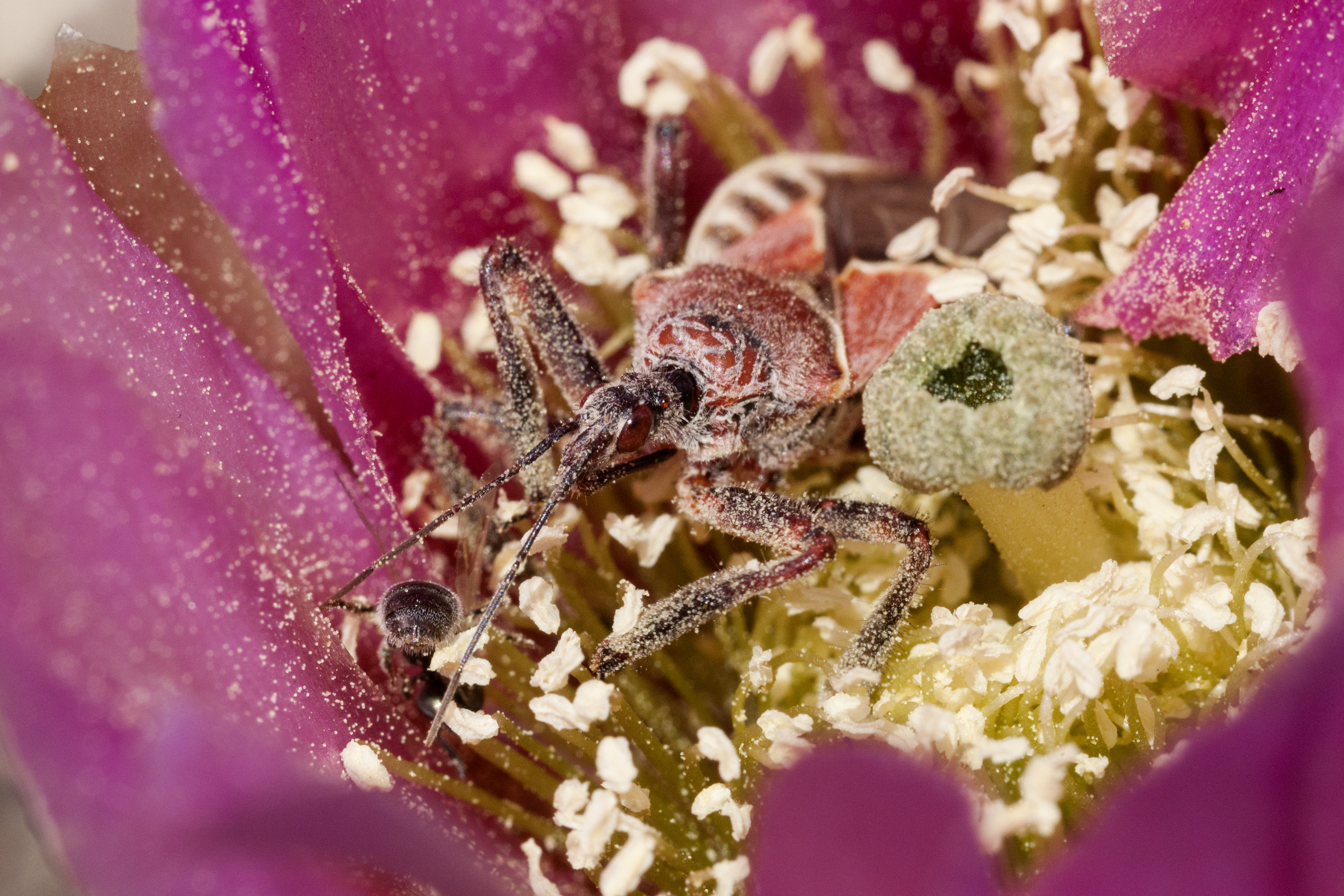
Apiomerus spissipes waiting for prey on a flower

Apiomerus are diurnal predators that lurk around flowers and bramble for arthropod prey. Instances of foraging outside stingless bee (Meliponinae) hives have been documented also.

The sticky globules of resin act as 'sticky traps' that help hold onto resisting prey before envenomation.

==== Maternal care ====
Female Apiomerus display a unique form of maternal care by further applying the collected resin onto egg clutches post oviposition. While this behaviour has only been documented in Apiomerus, the prevalence of the metatibial comb as an ancestral feature across all females in Apiomerini suggests resin-based maternal care to be a prevalent trait across many other members within the tribe.

The applied resin offers the clutch protection from desiccation and egg predators such as ants. Furthermore, the resin serves as a reservoir for newly emerging nymphs to form their first set of sticky traps.

== Selected species ==
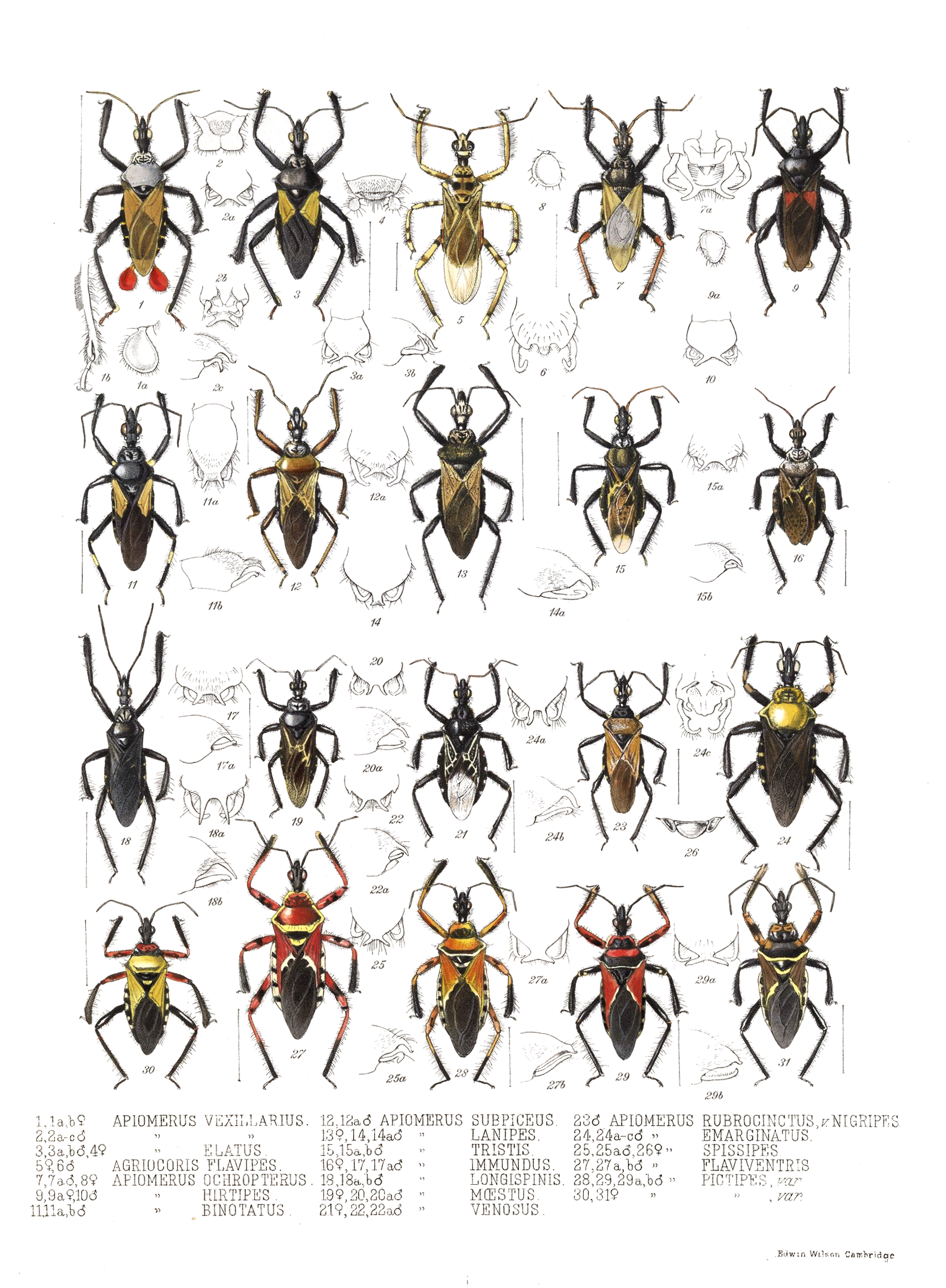
Apiomerus species

Apiomerus currently consists of about 110 described species. Some species of this genus include:

- Apiomerus californicus Berniker & Szerlip, 2011
- Apiomerus cazieri Berniker & Szerlip, 2011
- Apiomerus cooremani Costa Lima, Campos Seabra & Hathaway, 1951
- Apiomerus crassipes (Fabricius, 1803)
- Apiomerus flaviventris Herrich-Schaeffer, 1846
- Apiomerus floridensis Berniker & Szerlip, 2011
- Apiomerus geniculatus Erichson, 1848
- Apiomerus hirtipes (Fabricius, 1787)
- Apiomerus immundus Bergroth, 1898
- Apiomerus longispinis Champion, 1899
- Apiomerus moestus Stål, 1862
- Apiomerus montanus Berniker & Szerlip, 2011
- Apiomerus peninsularis Berniker & Szerlip, 2011
- Apiomerus pictipes Herrich-Schaeffer, 1846
- Apiomerus pilipes Fabricius, 1787
- Apiomerus repletus Uhler, 1876
- Apiomerus rufipennis (Fallou, 1889)
- Apiomerus spissipes (Say, 1825)
- Apiomerus subpiceus Stål, 1862
- Apiomerus wygodzinskyi Berniker & Szerlip, 2011
