= Rhyparus magnus =

Scientific classification
- Kingdom: Animalia
- Phylum: Arthropoda
- Clade: Pancrustacea
- Class: Insecta
- Order: Coleoptera
- Suborder: Polyphaga
- Infraorder: Scarabaeiformia
- Family: Scarabaeidae
- Genus: Rhyparus
- Species: R. magnus

Binomial name
- Rhyparus magnus Schmidt, 1911

Species of beetle

Rhyparus magnus is a species of beetle of the family Scarabaeidae. It is found in Indonesia (Java) and Malaysia (Sabah).

== Description ==
Adults reach a length of about 8–8.5 mm (0.31–0.33 in). They have an elongate, parallel-sided, nearly dull, black body, with dark brown legs.
