= Rhyparus birmanicus =

Scientific classification
- Kingdom: Animalia
- Phylum: Arthropoda
- Clade: Pancrustacea
- Class: Insecta
- Order: Coleoptera
- Suborder: Polyphaga
- Infraorder: Scarabaeiformia
- Family: Scarabaeidae
- Genus: Rhyparus
- Species: R. birmanicus

Binomial name
- Rhyparus birmanicus Fairmaire, 1897

Species of beetle

Rhyparus birmanicus is a species of beetle of the family Scarabaeidae. It is found in India and Myanmar.

== Description ==
Adults reach a length of about 5–6 mm (0.20–0.24 in). They have an elongate, faintly glossy, black body, with dark brown legs.
