= Sybacodes simplicicollis =

Scientific classification
- Kingdom: Animalia
- Phylum: Arthropoda
- Clade: Pancrustacea
- Class: Insecta
- Order: Coleoptera
- Suborder: Polyphaga
- Infraorder: Scarabaeiformia
- Family: Scarabaeidae
- Genus: Sybacodes
- Species: S. simplicicollis

Binomial name
- Sybacodes simplicicollis (Fairmaire, 1896)

Synonyms
- Rhyparus simplicicollis Fairmaire, 1896; Sybacodes aureopilosus Schmidt, 1909

Species of beetle

Sybacodes simplicicollis is a species of beetle of the family Scarabaeidae. It is found in China (Yunnan), India, Indonesia (Sumatra), Myanmar, Vietnam and Bhutan.

== Description ==
Adults reach a length of about 3.5–4 mm (0.14–0.16 in). They have an oblong-oval, dull, blackish-brown body, usually with a lighter-colored coating. The legs are lighter reddish-brown.

== Subspecies ==
- Sybacodes simplicicollis simplicicollis (China (Yunnan), India, Indonesia (Sumatra), Myanmar, Vietnam, Bhutan)
- Sybacodes simplicicollis aureopilosus Schmidt, 1909 (Bhutan, China (Yunnan), Vietnam)
