= Antecessorirhyparus octovirgatus =

Scientific classification
- Kingdom: Animalia
- Phylum: Arthropoda
- Clade: Pancrustacea
- Class: Insecta
- Order: Coleoptera
- Suborder: Polyphaga
- Infraorder: Scarabaeiformia
- Family: Scarabaeidae
- Genus: Antecessorirhyparus
- Species: A. octovirgatus

Binomial name
- Antecessorirhyparus octovirgatus (Schmidt, 1917)

Synonyms
- Rhyparus octovirgatus Schmidt, 1917

Species of beetle

Antecessorirhyparus octovirgatus is a species of beetle of the family Scarabaeidae. It is found in Fiji.

== Description ==
Adults reach a length of about 5 mm (0.20 in). They have an elongate-oval, flattened, shiny, almost glabrous, dark brownish body, with very small yellowish hairs on the head and all longitudinal costae on the pronotum and elytra.
