= Stephanitis rhododendri =

Scientific classification
- Domain: Eukaryota
- Kingdom: Animalia
- Phylum: Arthropoda
- Class: Insecta
- Order: Hemiptera
- Suborder: Heteroptera
- Family: Tingidae
- Tribe: Tingini
- Genus: Stephanitis
- Species: S. rhododendri

Binomial name
- Stephanitis rhododendri Horvath, 1905

Species of true bug

Stephanitis rhododendri, the rhododendron lace bug, is a species of lace bug in the family Tingidae. It is found in Africa, Australia, Europe and Northern Asia (excluding China), and North America.
