= Rhyparus helophoroides =

Scientific classification
- Kingdom: Animalia
- Phylum: Arthropoda
- Clade: Pancrustacea
- Class: Insecta
- Order: Coleoptera
- Suborder: Polyphaga
- Infraorder: Scarabaeiformia
- Family: Scarabaeidae
- Genus: Rhyparus
- Species: R. helophoroides

Binomial name
- Rhyparus helophoroides Fairmaire, 1893

Synonyms
- Rhyparus orousseti Paulian, 1981; Rhyparus amamianus Nakane, 1956; Rhyparus risbeci Paulian, 1934; Rhyparus australiae Lea, 1923

Species of beetle

Rhyparus helophoroides is a species of beetle of the family Scarabaeidae. It is found in Australia (New South Wales, Queensland), Papua New Guinea, Indonesia (Bacan, Bali, Irian Jaya, Java, Kalimantan, Obi, Sulawesi, Timor), Malaysia (Sabah), the Philippines (Luzon, Mindanao), Japan, Korea, Taiwan, New Caledonia, the Solomon Islands, Vanuatu, American Samoa and Samoa.

== Description ==
Adults reach a length of about 3.8–4.6 mm (0.15–0.18 in). The dorsal surface is brownish black, grey or black, the pronotum often with a brownish caste. The surface is dull and opaque.
