= Antecessorirhyparus =

Scientific classification
- Kingdom: Animalia
- Phylum: Arthropoda
- Clade: Pancrustacea
- Class: Insecta
- Order: Coleoptera
- Suborder: Polyphaga
- Infraorder: Scarabaeiformia
- Family: Scarabaeidae
- Subfamily: Aphodiinae
- Tribe: Rhyparini
- Genus: Antecessorirhyparus; Minkina, 2020

Genus of beetles

Antecessorirhyparus is a genus of beetles of the family Scarabaeidae.

== Species ==
- Antecessorirhyparus octovirgatus (Schmidt, 1917)
- Antecessorirhyparus papuanus Minkina & Jákl, 2024
- Antecessorirhyparus samoaensis Skelley & Minkina, 2025
