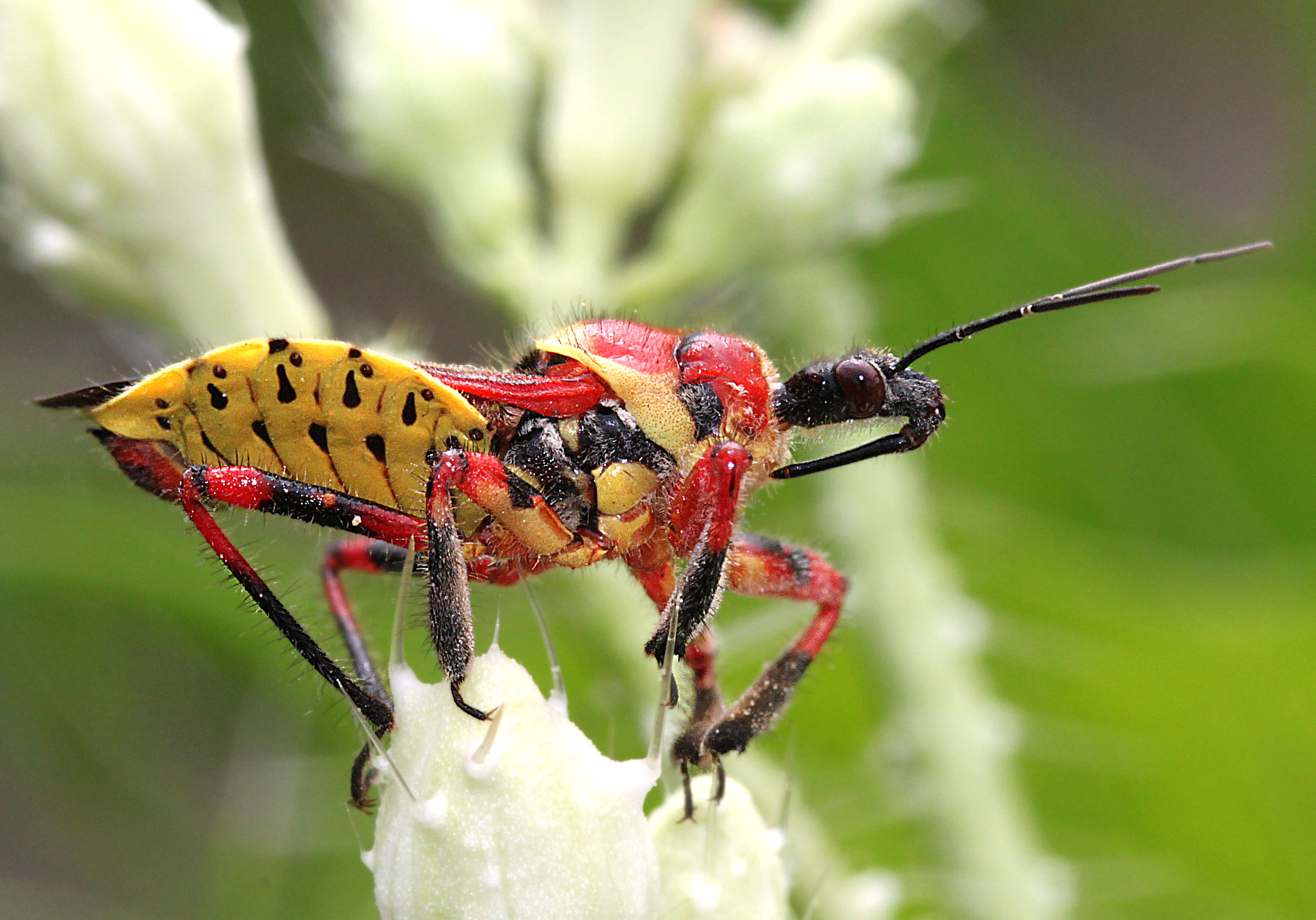

Scientific classification
- Domain: Eukaryota
- Kingdom: Animalia
- Phylum: Arthropoda
- Class: Insecta
- Order: Hemiptera
- Suborder: Heteroptera
- Family: Reduviidae
- Genus: Apiomerus
- Species: A. flaviventris

Binomial name
- Apiomerus flaviventris Herrich-Schaeffer, 1846

= Apiomerus flaviventris =

Species of true bug

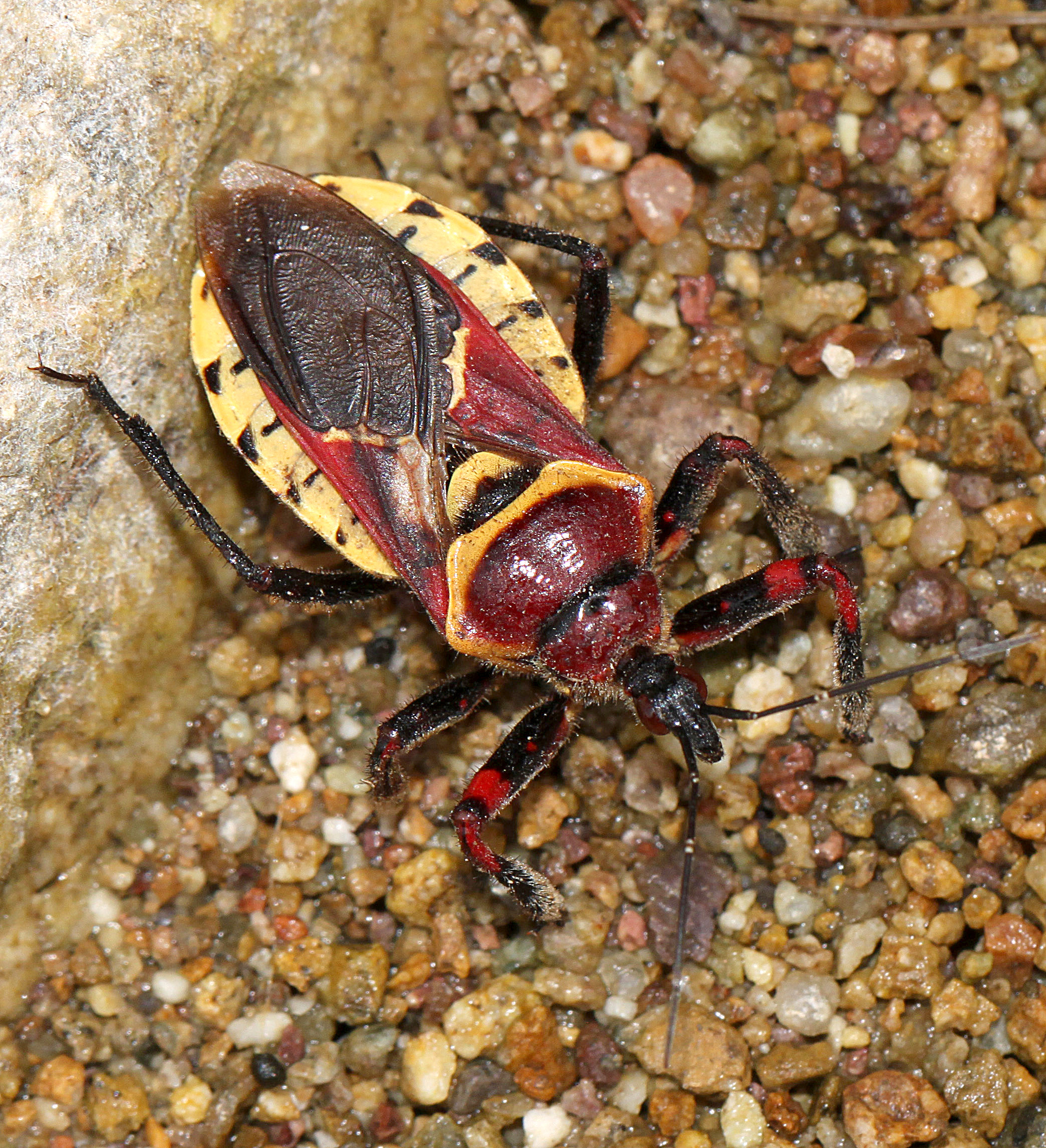
Yellow bellied bee assassin

Apiomerus flaviventris, a bee assassin bug (often called the yellow-bellied bee assassin), is an insect that feeds on bees. It is found in arid and semiarid southwestern North America. This bee assassin is known to extract plant resins and apply them as defensive chemicals to its eggs, protecting the eggs from predation, especially by ants, but possibly also other species. Females of A. flaviventris collect resin from brittlebush, Encelia farinosa Gray ex Torr. (Asteraceae).
