= Apiomerus longispinis =

Scientific classification
- Domain: Eukaryota
- Kingdom: Animalia
- Phylum: Arthropoda
- Class: Insecta
- Order: Hemiptera
- Suborder: Heteroptera
- Family: Reduviidae
- Genus: Apiomerus
- Species: A. longispinis

Binomial name
- Apiomerus longispinis Champion, 1899

Species of true bug

Apiomerus longispinis is a species of assassin bug in the family Reduviidae. It is found in Central America and North America.
