= Rhyparus nilgirensis =

Scientific classification
- Kingdom: Animalia
- Phylum: Arthropoda
- Clade: Pancrustacea
- Class: Insecta
- Order: Coleoptera
- Suborder: Polyphaga
- Infraorder: Scarabaeiformia
- Family: Scarabaeidae
- Genus: Rhyparus
- Species: R. nilgirensis

Binomial name
- Rhyparus nilgirensis Arrow, 1909

Species of beetle

Rhyparus nilgirensis is a species of beetle of the family Scarabaeidae. It is found in India (Tamil Nadu).

== Description ==
Adults reach a length of about 4–5 mm (0.16–0.20 in). They have an elongate, parallel-sided, slightly glossy, dark reddish-brown to blackish-brown body.
