= Leptorhyparus brasiliensis =

Scientific classification
- Kingdom: Animalia
- Phylum: Arthropoda
- Clade: Pancrustacea
- Class: Insecta
- Order: Coleoptera
- Suborder: Polyphaga
- Infraorder: Scarabaeiformia
- Family: Scarabaeidae
- Genus: Leptorhyparus
- Species: L. brasiliensis

Binomial name
- Leptorhyparus brasiliensis Minkina, 2020

Species of beetle

Leptorhyparus brasiliensis is a species of beetle of the family Scarabaeidae. It is found in Brazil (Rondônia).

== Description ==
Adults reach a length of about 2.3 mm (0.091 in). The head is widely and weakly sinuate medially, bounded by obtuse angles, with the lateral margins sinuate before the rounded gena and with a protruding eye line. The clypeus has two longitudinal costae medially and the frons has four longitudinal costae. The pronotum has six longitudinal ridges which are weakly elevated, and only the two central ridges are complete. The elytra have five elevated costae and five convex interstriae with a row of coarse punctures between them.
