= Cartwrightia intertribalis =

Scientific classification
- Kingdom: Animalia
- Phylum: Arthropoda
- Clade: Pancrustacea
- Class: Insecta
- Order: Coleoptera
- Suborder: Polyphaga
- Infraorder: Scarabaeiformia
- Family: Scarabaeidae
- Genus: Cartwrightia
- Species: C. intertribalis

Binomial name
- Cartwrightia intertribalis Islas, 1958

Species of beetle

Cartwrightia intertribalis is a species of beetle of the family Scarabaeidae. It is found in Mexico (Chiapas, Guerrero, Sinaloa).

== Description ==
Adults reach a length of about 3.31 mm (0.130 in). They have an elongate, subparallel body, with the head, pronotum, and elytral costae covered with argillaceous covering, and with the intervals of the elytra shining and dark castaneous.
