= Rhyparus annamariae =

Scientific classification
- Kingdom: Animalia
- Phylum: Arthropoda
- Clade: Pancrustacea
- Class: Insecta
- Order: Coleoptera
- Suborder: Polyphaga
- Infraorder: Scarabaeiformia
- Family: Scarabaeidae
- Genus: Rhyparus
- Species: R. annamariae

Binomial name
- Rhyparus annamariae Minkina, 2017

Species of beetle

Rhyparus annamariae is a species of beetle of the family Scarabaeidae. It is found in Vietnam.

== Description ==
Adults reach a length of about 3.3–3.4 mm (0.13–0.13 in). They have an elongate, moderately convex, rather flattened, moderately shiny, castaneous body.

== Etymology ==
The species is named in honour of the daughter of a friend of the author, Anna Maria Bischoff-Byk.
