= Rhyparus verrucosus =

Scientific classification
- Kingdom: Animalia
- Phylum: Arthropoda
- Clade: Pancrustacea
- Class: Insecta
- Order: Coleoptera
- Suborder: Polyphaga
- Infraorder: Scarabaeiformia
- Family: Scarabaeidae
- Genus: Rhyparus
- Species: R. verrucosus

Binomial name
- Rhyparus verrucosus Schmidt, 1917

Species of beetle

Rhyparus verrucosus is a species of beetle of the family Scarabaeidae. It is found in Indonesia (Sumatra, Bali).

== Description ==
Adults reach a length of about 7 mm (0.28 in). They have an elongate, parallel-sided, dull, black body.
