= Sybacodes =

Scientific classification
- Kingdom: Animalia
- Phylum: Arthropoda
- Clade: Pancrustacea
- Class: Insecta
- Order: Coleoptera
- Suborder: Polyphaga
- Infraorder: Scarabaeiformia
- Family: Scarabaeidae
- Subfamily: Aphodiinae
- Tribe: Rhyparini
- Genus: Sybacodes; Fairmaire, 1896

Genus of beetles

Sybacodes is a genus of beetles of the family Scarabaeidae.

== Species ==
- Sybacodes borneensis Minkina, Mencl & Bellmann, 2018
- Sybacodes liliae Dellacasa, 1978
- Sybacodes lutulentus Fairmaire, 1896
- Sybacodes simplicicollis (Fairmaire, 1896)
