= Rhyparus saundersi =

Scientific classification
- Kingdom: Animalia
- Phylum: Arthropoda
- Clade: Pancrustacea
- Class: Insecta
- Order: Coleoptera
- Suborder: Polyphaga
- Infraorder: Scarabaeiformia
- Family: Scarabaeidae
- Genus: Rhyparus
- Species: R. saundersi

Binomial name
- Rhyparus saundersi (Pascoe, 1866)

Synonyms
- Antrisis saundersi Pascoe, 1866

Species of beetle

Rhyparus saundersi is a species of beetle of the family Scarabaeidae. It is found in Malaysia (Sarawak).

== Description ==
Adults reach a length of about 5 mm (0.20 in). The dorsal surface has a greyish-brown coating.
