= Rhyparus ironensis =

Scientific classification
- Kingdom: Animalia
- Phylum: Arthropoda
- Clade: Pancrustacea
- Class: Insecta
- Order: Coleoptera
- Suborder: Polyphaga
- Infraorder: Scarabaeiformia
- Family: Scarabaeidae
- Genus: Rhyparus
- Species: R. ironensis

Binomial name
- Rhyparus ironensis Stebnicka & Howden, 1996

Species of beetle

Rhyparus ironensis is a species of beetle of the family Scarabaeidae. It is found in Australia (Queensland).

== Description ==
Adults reach a length of about 4.5–4.7 mm (0.18–0.19 in). The dorsal surface is shining reddish-brown.
