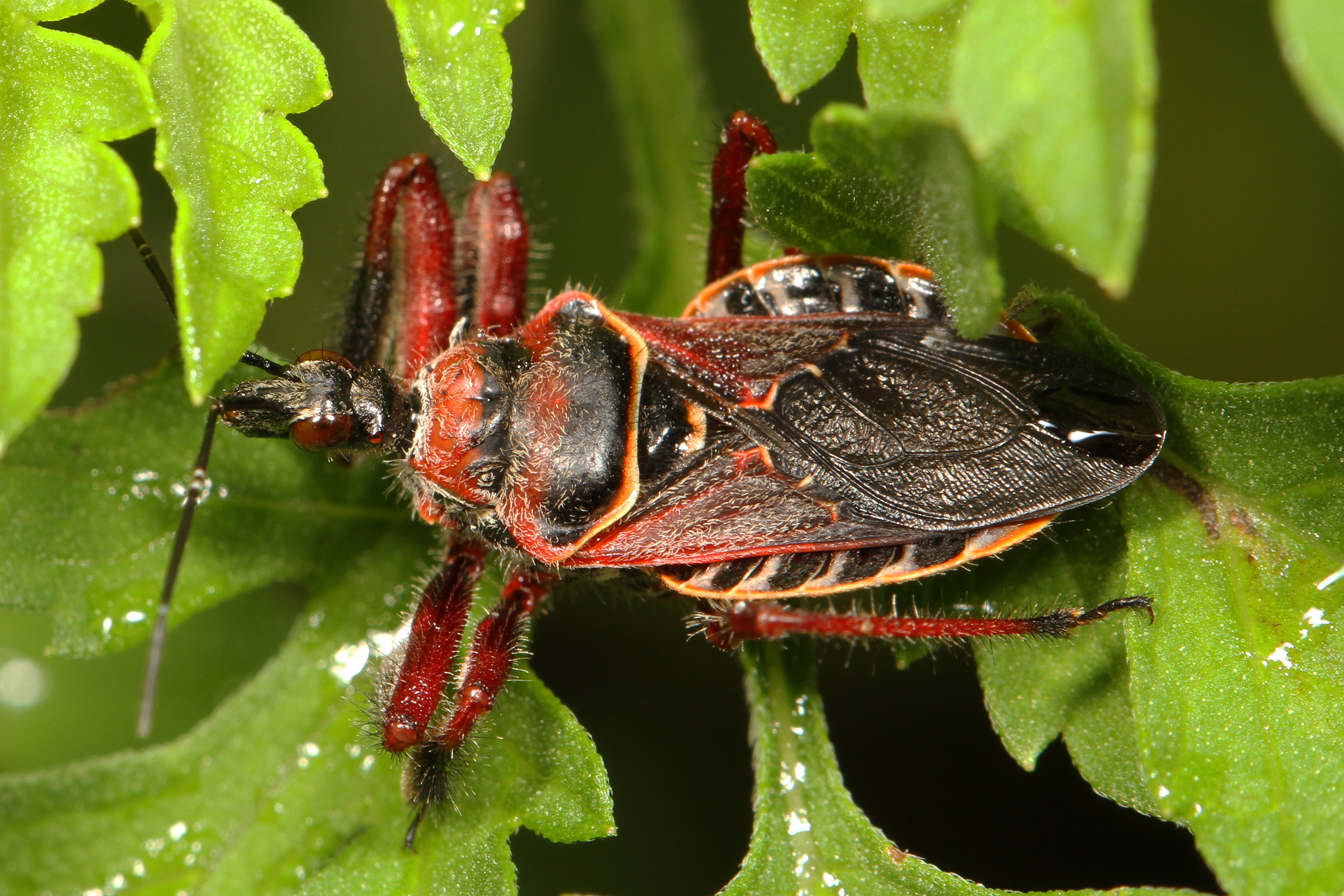
- Apiomerus floridensis, Florida bee assassin

Scientific classification
- Kingdom: Animalia
- Phylum: Arthropoda
- Class: Insecta
- Order: Hemiptera
- Suborder: Heteroptera
- Family: Reduviidae
- Genus: Apiomerus
- Species: A. floridensis

Binomial name
- Apiomerus floridensis Berniker & Szerlip, 2011

= Apiomerus floridensis =

Species of insect

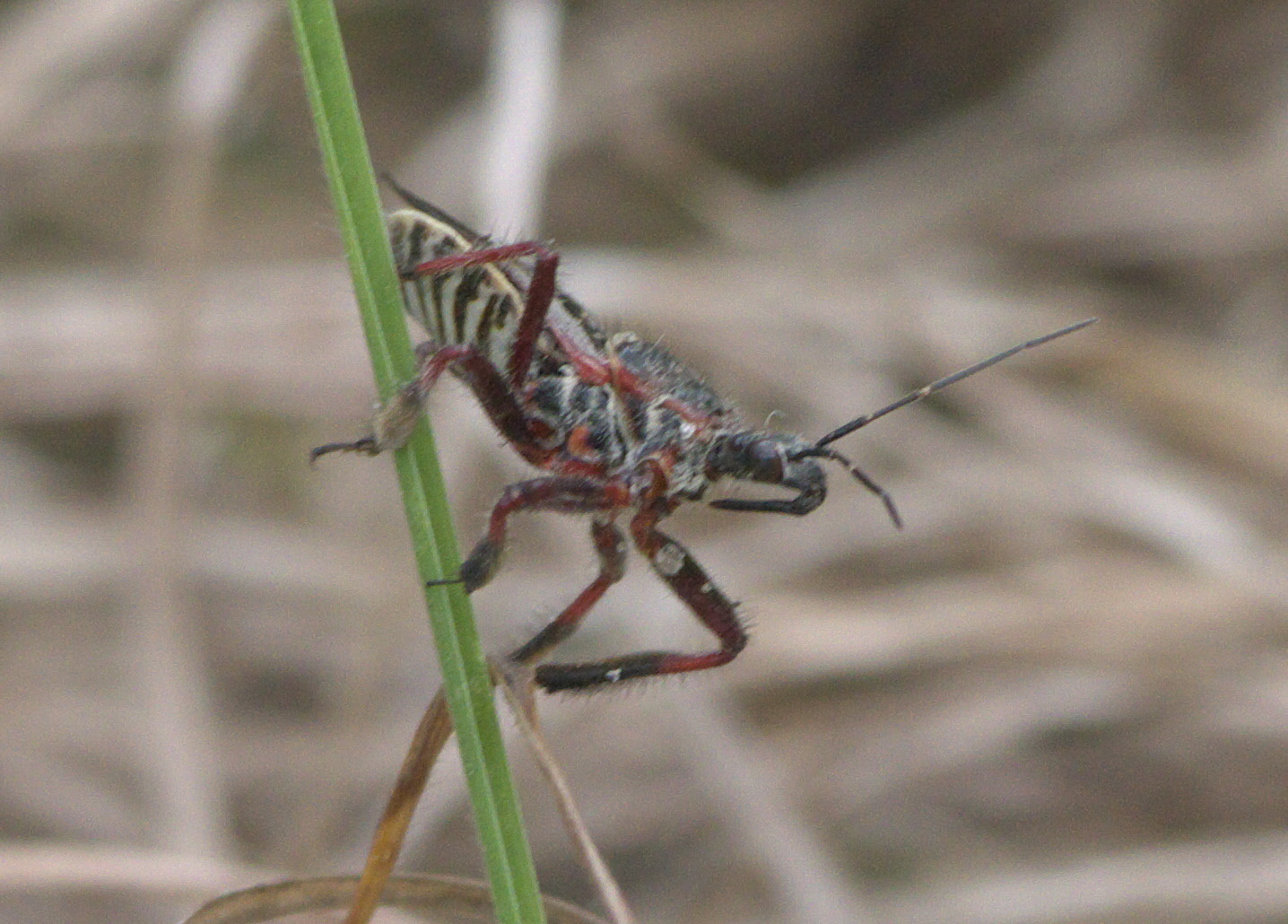
Apiomerus floridensis, Florida bee assassin, Florida

Apiomerus floridensis is a species of bee assassin endemic to Florida.

== Description ==
Males typically are 12.5 to 14.2 mm (0.49 to 0.56 in) in length while females are 13.9 to 16.2 mm (0.55 to 0.64 in).

== Range ==
Florida, particularly southward from Duval County, and northern Mexico.
