= Rhyparus xanthi =

Scientific classification
- Kingdom: Animalia
- Phylum: Arthropoda
- Clade: Pancrustacea
- Class: Insecta
- Order: Coleoptera
- Suborder: Polyphaga
- Infraorder: Scarabaeiformia
- Family: Scarabaeidae
- Genus: Rhyparus
- Species: R. xanthi

Binomial name
- Rhyparus xanthi (Frivaldszky, 1883)

Synonyms
- Antrisis xanthi Frivaldszky, 1883

Species of beetle

Rhyparus xanthi is a species of beetle of the family Scarabaeidae. It is found in Malaysia (Sabah).

== Description ==
Adults reach a length of about 4 mm (0.16 in). They have a moderately shiny, blackish body.
