= Aschnarhyparus =

Scientific classification
- Kingdom: Animalia
- Phylum: Arthropoda
- Clade: Pancrustacea
- Class: Insecta
- Order: Coleoptera
- Suborder: Polyphaga
- Infraorder: Scarabaeiformia
- Family: Scarabaeidae
- Subfamily: Aphodiinae
- Tribe: Rhyparini
- Genus: Aschnarhyparus; Makhan, 2006
- Species: A. peregrinus

Binomial name
- Aschnarhyparus peregrinus (Hinton, 1934)

Synonyms
- Termitodius peregrinus Hinton, 1934; Aschnarhyparus soesilae Makhan, 2006; Termitodius boliviensis Dajoz, 1971

Genus of beetles

Aschnarhyparus is a genus of beetle of the family Scarabaeidae. It is monotypic, being represented by the single species, Aschnarhyparus peregrinus, which is found in Bolivia, Brazil (Acre, Amazonas, Mato Grosso, Pará), Colombia, Costa Rica, Ecuador, French Guiana, Mexico (Chiapas, Hidalgo), Nicaragua, Panama, Peru, Suriname, Trinidad & Tobago and Venezuela.

== Description ==
Adults reach a length of about 3–3.8 mm (0.12–0.15 in). The body is elongate, oval, posteriorly narrowed and piceous. The head has six short longitudinal carinae and the clypeus has a transversal groove before the anterior margin, with four teeth, two anterior to the clypeal margin and two just before the gena. The pronotum has a sinuate lateral margin, with two lateral lobes and six medially longitudinal carinae interrupted by a row of large pits. The elytra are narrowed posteriorly, with eight longitudinal carinae and two posterior setaceous tubercles.

== Life history ==
Specimens have been found inside dead trees, were extracted from Ochroma pyramidale roots and from the nests of Coptotermes and Nasutitermes species.
