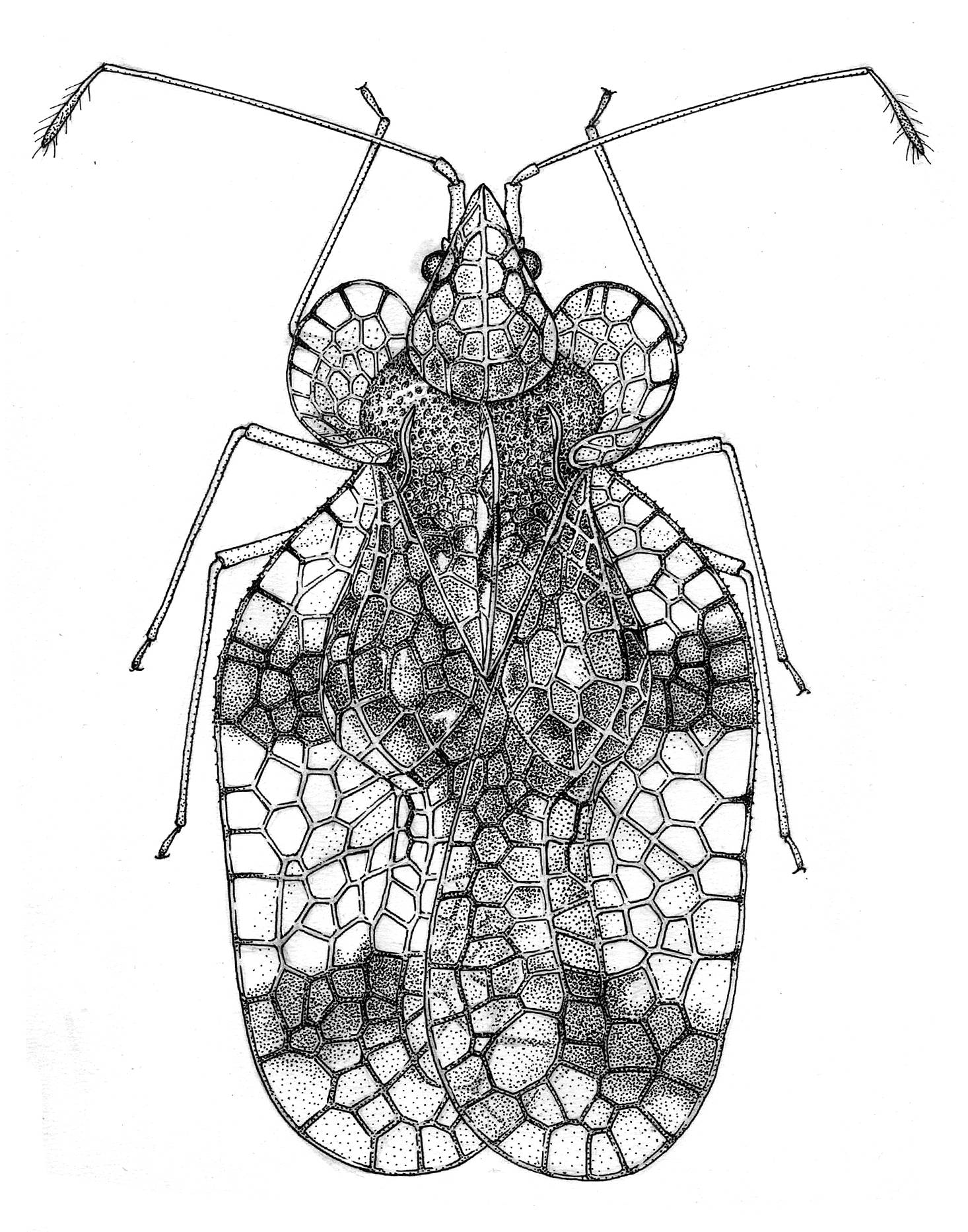
- Drawing of the species

Scientific classification
- Kingdom: Animalia
- Phylum: Arthropoda
- Class: Insecta
- Order: Hemiptera
- Suborder: Heteroptera
- Family: Tingidae
- Tribe: Tingini
- Genus: Stephanitis
- Species: S. pyri

Binomial name
- Stephanitis pyri (Fabricius, 1775)

Synonyms
- Stephanitis piri

= Stephanitis pyri =

Species of true bug

Stephanitis pyri, the pear lace bug, is a species of lace bug in the family Tingidae. It is found in Northern Africa, Southern and Central Europe, and Asia. The species is considered a pest for apple and pear trees, and is said to be polyphagous. S.pyri was first described by Johan Christian Fabricius in 1775.
