= Rhyparus philippinensis =

Scientific classification
- Kingdom: Animalia
- Phylum: Arthropoda
- Clade: Pancrustacea
- Class: Insecta
- Order: Coleoptera
- Suborder: Polyphaga
- Infraorder: Scarabaeiformia
- Family: Scarabaeidae
- Genus: Rhyparus
- Species: R. philippinensis

Binomial name
- Rhyparus philippinensis Arrow, 1905

Species of beetle

Rhyparus philippinensis is a species of beetle of the family Scarabaeidae. It is found in the Philippines (Luzon, Mindanao, Samar).

== Description ==
Adults reach a length of about 4–5 mm (0.16–0.20 in). They have an elongate, parallel-sided, rather dull, black body.
