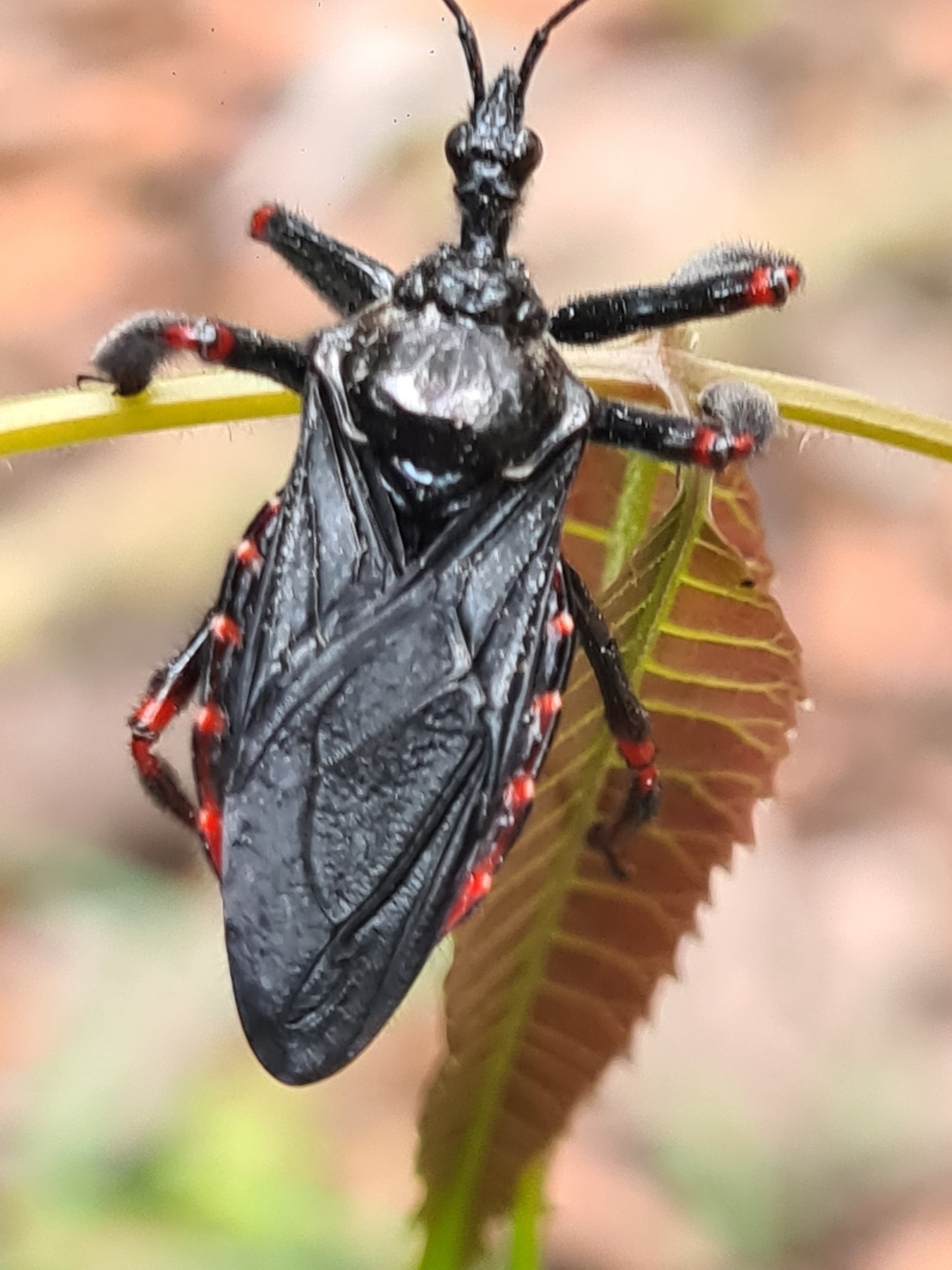

Scientific classification
- Kingdom: Animalia
- Phylum: Arthropoda
- Class: Insecta
- Order: Hemiptera
- Suborder: Heteroptera
- Family: Reduviidae
- Genus: Apiomerus
- Species: A. geniculatus

Binomial name
- Apiomerus geniculatus Erichson, 1848
- Distribution Native range

= Apiomerus geniculatus =

Insect species

Apiomerus geniculatus is a species of insect from the genus Apiomerus. The species was originally described by Wilhelm Ferdinand Erichson.

== Range ==
Apiomerus geniculatus has been observed and described in The Guianas and Brazil (North Region). Crowdsourcing initiatives seem to confirm this.
