= Cartwrightia islasi =

Scientific classification
- Kingdom: Animalia
- Phylum: Arthropoda
- Clade: Pancrustacea
- Class: Insecta
- Order: Coleoptera
- Suborder: Polyphaga
- Infraorder: Scarabaeiformia
- Family: Scarabaeidae
- Genus: Cartwrightia
- Species: C. islasi

Binomial name
- Cartwrightia islasi Cartwright, 1967

Species of beetle

Cartwrightia islasi is a species of beetle of the family Scarabaeidae. It is found in El Salvador, Guatemala and Mexico (Chiapas, Guerrero, Sinaloa, Veracruz).

== Description ==
Adults reach a length of about 3.45–4 mm (0.136–0.157 in). They have an elongate, subparallel, generally dark reddish brown body, with areas of greyish golden-brown argillaceous coating on the head, pronotum, tips of the elytra and underside.

== Etymology ==
The species is named in honour of Dr. Federico Islas, who described the genus and its first species.
