= Leptorhyparus =

Scientific classification
- Kingdom: Animalia
- Phylum: Arthropoda
- Clade: Pancrustacea
- Class: Insecta
- Order: Coleoptera
- Suborder: Polyphaga
- Infraorder: Scarabaeiformia
- Family: Scarabaeidae
- Subfamily: Aphodiinae
- Tribe: Rhyparini
- Genus: Leptorhyparus; Howden, 2003

Genus of beetles

Leptorhyparus is a genus of beetles of the family Scarabaeidae.

== Species ==
- Leptorhyparus brasiliensis Minkina, 2020
- Leptorhyparus gilli Howden, 2003
- Leptorhyparus peruanus Minkina, 2020
- †Leptorhyparus quadricornis Skelley, 2021
