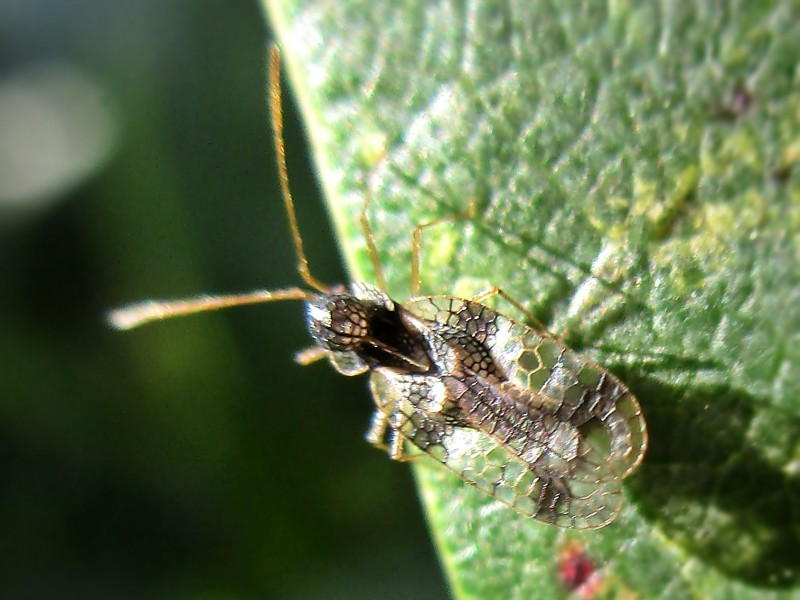

Scientific classification
- Kingdom: Animalia
- Phylum: Arthropoda
- Clade: Pancrustacea
- Class: Insecta
- Order: Hemiptera
- Suborder: Heteroptera
- Family: Tingidae
- Genus: Stephanitis
- Species: S. takeyai

Binomial name
- Stephanitis takeyai Drake & Maa, 1955

= Stephanitis takeyai =

Andromeda lace bug

Species of true bug

The andromeda lace bug (Stephanitis takeyai) is a pest insect on plants of the genus Pieris, especially Pieris japonica, the Japanese andromeda. It originated in Japan with its host plant but has since been introduced to other areas of the globe. At least one Pieris species, Pieris floribunda, is resistant to the lace bug.

The andromeda lace bug is about 3 millimeters in length. It has a characteristic rounded pronotum, lacy black and white wings, and shiny gold highlighting.

The bug produces mottling on the leaves of the plant, and heavy infestations can cause the leaves to drop in large numbers, stunting the plant's growth. Both nymph and adult forms damage the leaves by piercing them to suck the juices, and leave dark frass on the undersides of the leaves. Damage is worst on plants that grow in full sun.
