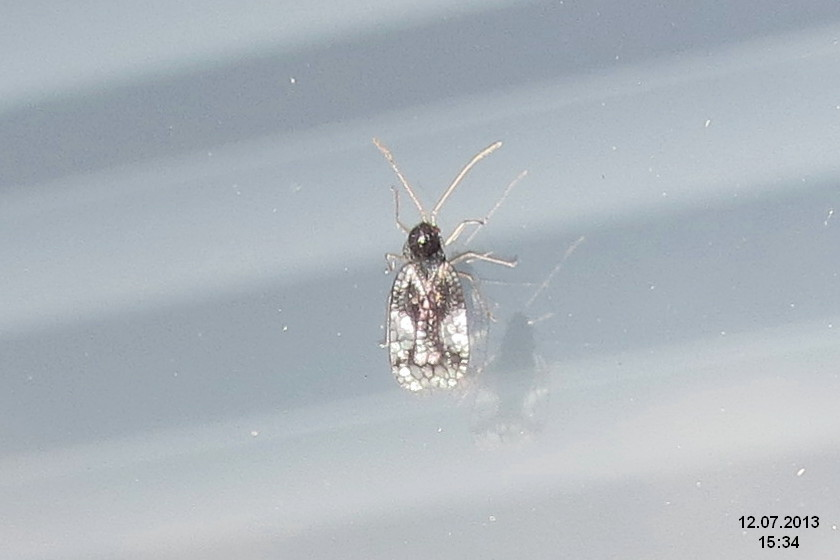
- Stephanitis pyrioides

Scientific classification
- Kingdom: Animalia
- Phylum: Arthropoda
- Clade: Pancrustacea
- Class: Insecta
- Order: Hemiptera
- Suborder: Heteroptera
- Family: Tingidae
- Subfamily: Tinginae
- Tribe: Tingini
- Genus: Stephanitis; Stål, 1873

Subgenera
- Stephanitis (Menodora) Horváth, 1912; Stephanitis (Norba) Horváth, 1912; Stephanitis (Stephanitis) Stål, 1873

= Stephanitis =

Genus of true bugs

Stephanitis is a genus of lace bugs in the family Tingidae. There are at least 90 described species in Stephanitis.

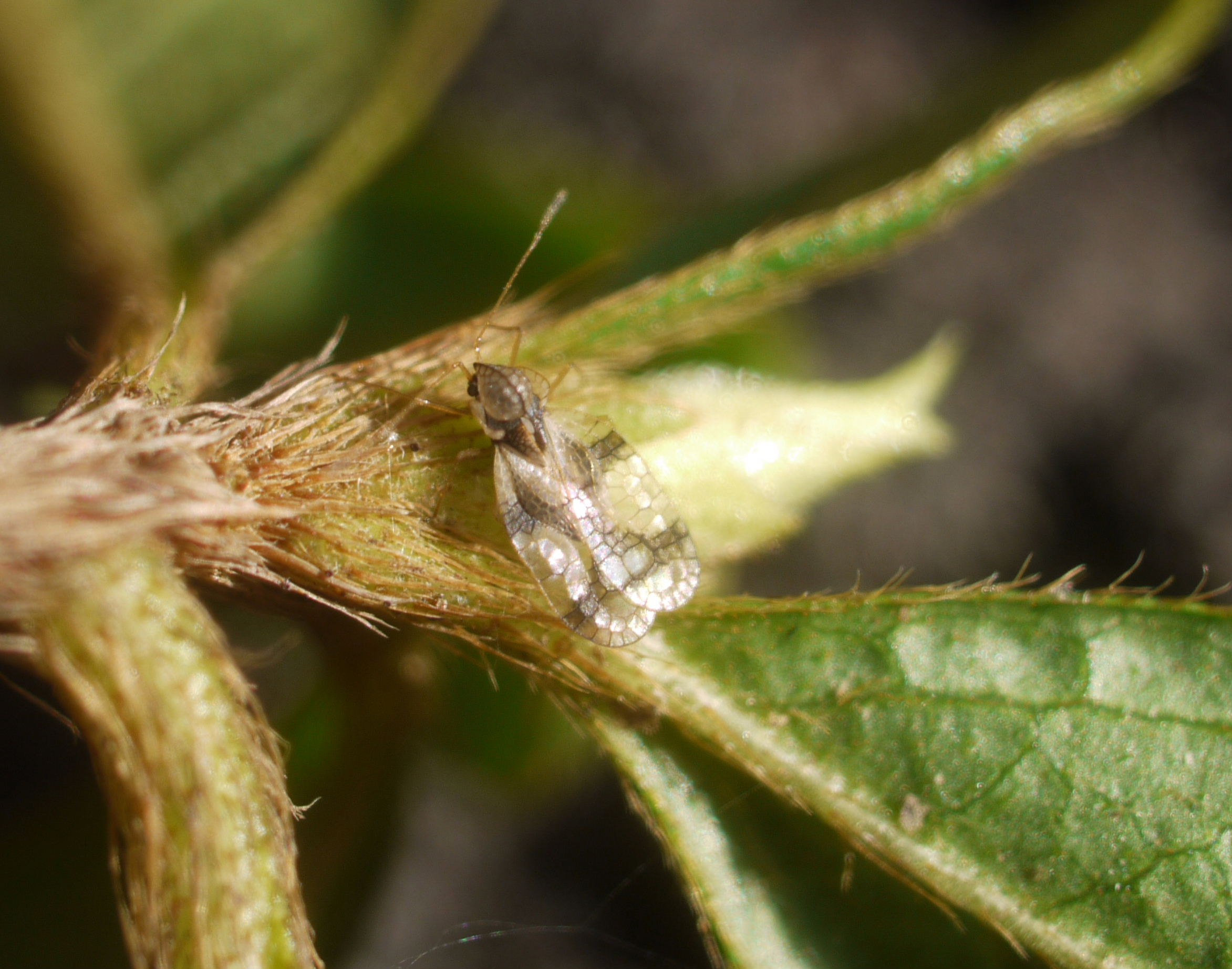
Stephanitis pyrioides

== Species ==
These 90 species belong to the genus Stephanitis:

- Stephanitis agaica Drake, 1960
- Stephanitis ambigua Horvath, 1912
- Stephanitis amboinae Drake & Poor, 1941
- Stephanitis anapetes Drake & Ruhoff, 1965
- Stephanitis aperta Horvath, 1912
- Stephanitis assamana Drake & Maa, 1954
- Stephanitis astralis Drake & Poor, 1941
- Stephanitis aucta Drake, 1942
- Stephanitis bankana Drake
- Stephanitis bhutanensis Péricart, 1985
- Stephanitis blatchleyi Drake, 1925
- Stephanitis caucasica Kiritshenko, 1939
- Stephanitis charieis Drake & Mohanasundarum, 1961
- Stephanitis chinensis Drake, 1948
- Stephanitis chlorophana (Fieber, 1861)
- Stephanitis cinnamomae Livingstone & Jeyanthibai, 1994
- Stephanitis colocasiae Horvath, 1912
- Stephanitis decasperni Guilbert, 2006-30
- Stephanitis depressa Blöte, 1945
- Stephanitis desecta Horvath, 1912
- Stephanitis drakei Takeya, 1963
- Stephanitis esakii Takeya, 1931
- Stephanitis exigua Horvath, 1912
- Stephanitis farameae Drake & Hambleton, 1935
- Stephanitis fasciicarina Takeya, 1931
- Stephanitis formosa Horvath, 1912
- Stephanitis gallarum Horváth, 1906
- Stephanitis gracilenta Péricart, 1986
- Stephanitis gressitti Drake, 1948
- Stephanitis hakkodasana Takeya, 1963
- Stephanitis hikosana Drake, 1948
- Stephanitis hiurai Takeya, 1963
- Stephanitis hoberlandti B.Lis, 2002-30
- Stephanitis hydrangeae Drake & Maa, 1955
- Stephanitis illicii Jing, 1989
- Stephanitis indiana Drake
- Stephanitis kardia Drake & Ruhoff, 1960
- Stephanitis kyushuana Drake
- Stephanitis laratana Drake, 1948
- Stephanitis laudata Drake & Poor, 1953
- Stephanitis lauri Rietschel, 2014-01
- Stephanitis ligrya Drake, 1960
- Stephanitis ligyra Drake, 1960
- Stephanitis luzonana Drake, 1948
- Stephanitis macaona Drake, 1948
- Stephanitis macranthai Livingstone & Jeyanthibai, 1994
- Stephanitis matsumurae Horvath, 1912
- Stephanitis mendica Horvath, 1912
- Stephanitis mitrata (Stal, 1858)
- Stephanitis miyamotoi Takeya, 1963
- Stephanitis morimotoi Takeya, 1963
- Stephanitis nashi Esaki & Takeya, 1931
- Stephanitis nitor Drake & Poor, 1937
- Stephanitis nitoris Drake & Poor, 1937
- Stephanitis oberti (Kolenati, 1856)
- Stephanitis olyrae Drake & Hambleton, 1935
- Stephanitis oschanini Vasiliev, 1935
- Stephanitis othnius Drake & Ruhoff, 1965
- Stephanitis outouana Drake & Maa, 1953
- Stephanitis pagana Drake & Maa, 1953
- Stephanitis parana Drake & Hambleton, 1944
- Stephanitis princeps (Distant, 1910)
- Stephanitis propinqua Horvath, 1912
- Stephanitis pyri (Fabricius, 1775)
- Stephanitis pyrioides (Scott, 1874) (azalea lace bug)
- Stephanitis queenslandensis Hacker, 1927
- Stephanitis querca Bergroth, 1924
- Stephanitis rhododendri Horvath, 1905 (rhododendron lace bug)
- Stephanitis rhododrendri Horváth, 1905
- Stephanitis rozanovi Golub & Popov, 2003
- Stephanitis scotti Takeya, 1963
- Stephanitis shintenana Drake
- Stephanitis shirakii Miyamoto, 1964
- Stephanitis sondaica Horvath, 1912
- Stephanitis sordida Distant, 1909
- Stephanitis sparsa Péricart, 1984
- Stephanitis steeleae Drake & Maa, 1954
- Stephanitis subfaciata Horváth, 1912
- Stephanitis subfasciata Horvath, 1912
- Stephanitis suffusa (Distant, 1903)
- Stephanitis svensoni Drake, 1948
- Stephanitis tabidula Horvath, 1912
- Stephanitis takeyai Drake & Maa, 1955 (Andromeda lace bug)
- Stephanitis typica (Distant, 1903)
- Stephanitis veridica Drake, 1948
- Stephanitis vietnamensis Guilbert, 2015-12
- Stephanitis watanabei Takeya, 1963
- Stephanitis wittmeri Péricart, 1985
- Stephanitis yasumatsui Takeya, 1951
- Stephanitis yunnana Drake & Maa, 1955
