= Termitodius coronatus =

Scientific classification
- Kingdom: Animalia
- Phylum: Arthropoda
- Clade: Pancrustacea
- Class: Insecta
- Order: Coleoptera
- Suborder: Polyphaga
- Infraorder: Scarabaeiformia
- Family: Scarabaeidae
- Genus: Termitodius
- Species: T. coronatus

Binomial name
- Termitodius coronatus Wasmann, 1894

Species of beetle

Termitodius coronatus is a species of beetle of the family Scarabaeidae. It is found in Brazil (Acre, Rondônia) and Venezuela.

== Description ==
Adults reach a length of about 4 mm (0.16 in). The body has opaque bulbous and carinate areas and the clypeus and elytral surface between the carinae and tubercles near the posterior margin are glossy. The pronotum has paramedian costae with the anterior lobes elevated and circular in dorsal view, almost as big as the lobes of the other pronotal costae.

== Life history ==
Specimens have been collected in nests of Nasititermes meinerti.
