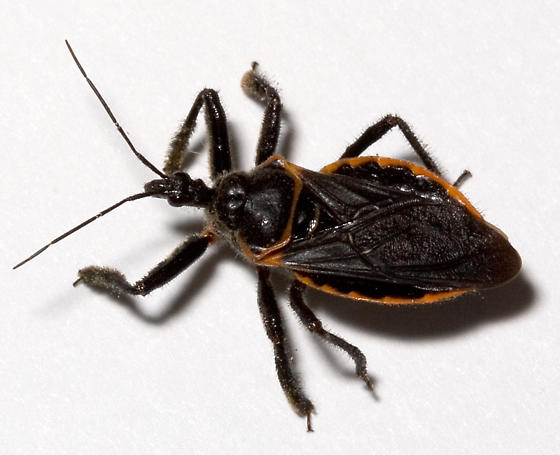

Scientific classification
- Kingdom: Animalia
- Phylum: Arthropoda
- Class: Insecta
- Order: Hemiptera
- Suborder: Heteroptera
- Family: Reduviidae
- Genus: Apiomerus
- Species: A. crassipes

Binomial name
- Apiomerus crassipes (Fabricius, 1803)

= Apiomerus crassipes =

Species of true bug

Apiomerus crassipes, the bee assassin, is an insect that feeds on bees and ants. It is found throughout North America. Bee assassins can fly, and stalk flowering plants that are visited by bees, flies, and other pollinating insects. Bee assassins are usually dark in color with yellow or red markings on the sides of the abdomen, and are about 3/4 in long.

The bee assassins' fore tibiae are coated with a sticky resin to aid in prey capture.
