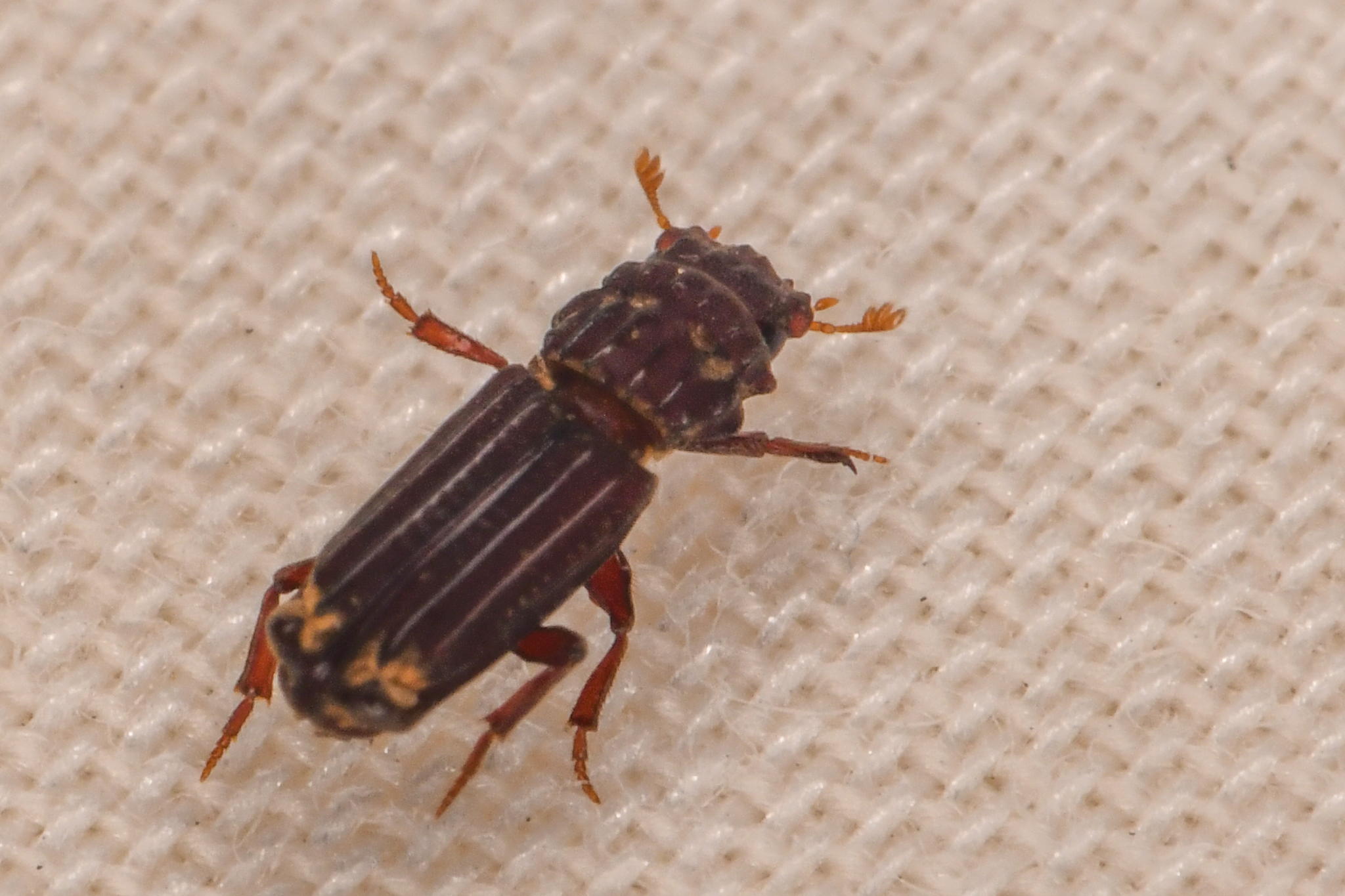
- Rhyparus, Costa Rica

Scientific classification
- Kingdom: Animalia
- Phylum: Arthropoda
- Clade: Pancrustacea
- Class: Insecta
- Order: Coleoptera
- Suborder: Polyphaga
- Infraorder: Scarabaeiformia
- Family: Scarabaeidae
- Subfamily: Aphodiinae
- Tribe: Rhyparini; Schmidt, 1910

= Rhyparini =

Tribe of beetles

Rhyparini is a tribe of scarab beetles in the family Scarabaeidae. There are about 14 genera and more than 120 described species in Rhyparini.

== Genera ==
These 14 genera belong to the tribe Rhyparini:

- Antecessorirhyparus Minkina, 2020
- Aschnarhyparus Makhan, 2006
- Hadrorhyparus Howden, 1995
- Leptorhyparus Howden, 2003
- Lioglyptoxenus Pittino, 2006
- Megasybacodes Kakizoe, Maruyama & Masumoto, 2019
- Microtermitodius Pittino, 2006
- Monteitheolus Howden & Storey, 2000
- Nanotermitodius Howden, 2003
- Rhyparus Agassiz, 1846
- Sybacodes Fairmaire, 1896
- Termitodiellus Nakane, 1961
- Termitodius Wasmann, 1894
- † Priscyparus Skelley, 2021
