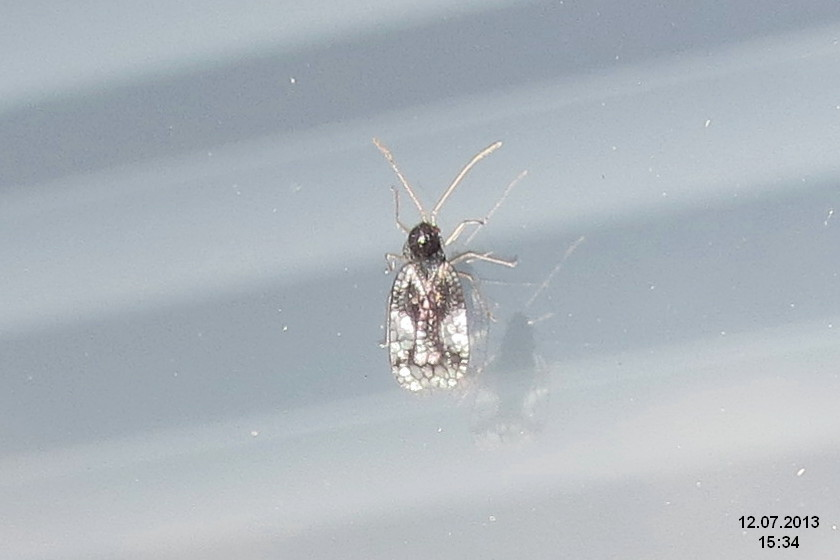

Scientific classification
- Domain: Eukaryota
- Kingdom: Animalia
- Phylum: Arthropoda
- Class: Insecta
- Order: Hemiptera
- Suborder: Heteroptera
- Family: Tingidae
- Tribe: Tingini
- Genus: Stephanitis
- Species: S. pyrioides

Binomial name
- Stephanitis pyrioides (Scott, 1874)

Synonyms
- Tingis pyrioides Scott, 1874

= Stephanitis pyrioides =

Species of true bug

Stephanitis pyrioides, the azalea lace bug, is a species of lace bug in the family Tingidae. It is found in Africa, Australia, Europe and Northern Asia (excluding China), North America, Oceania, South America, and Southern Asia.

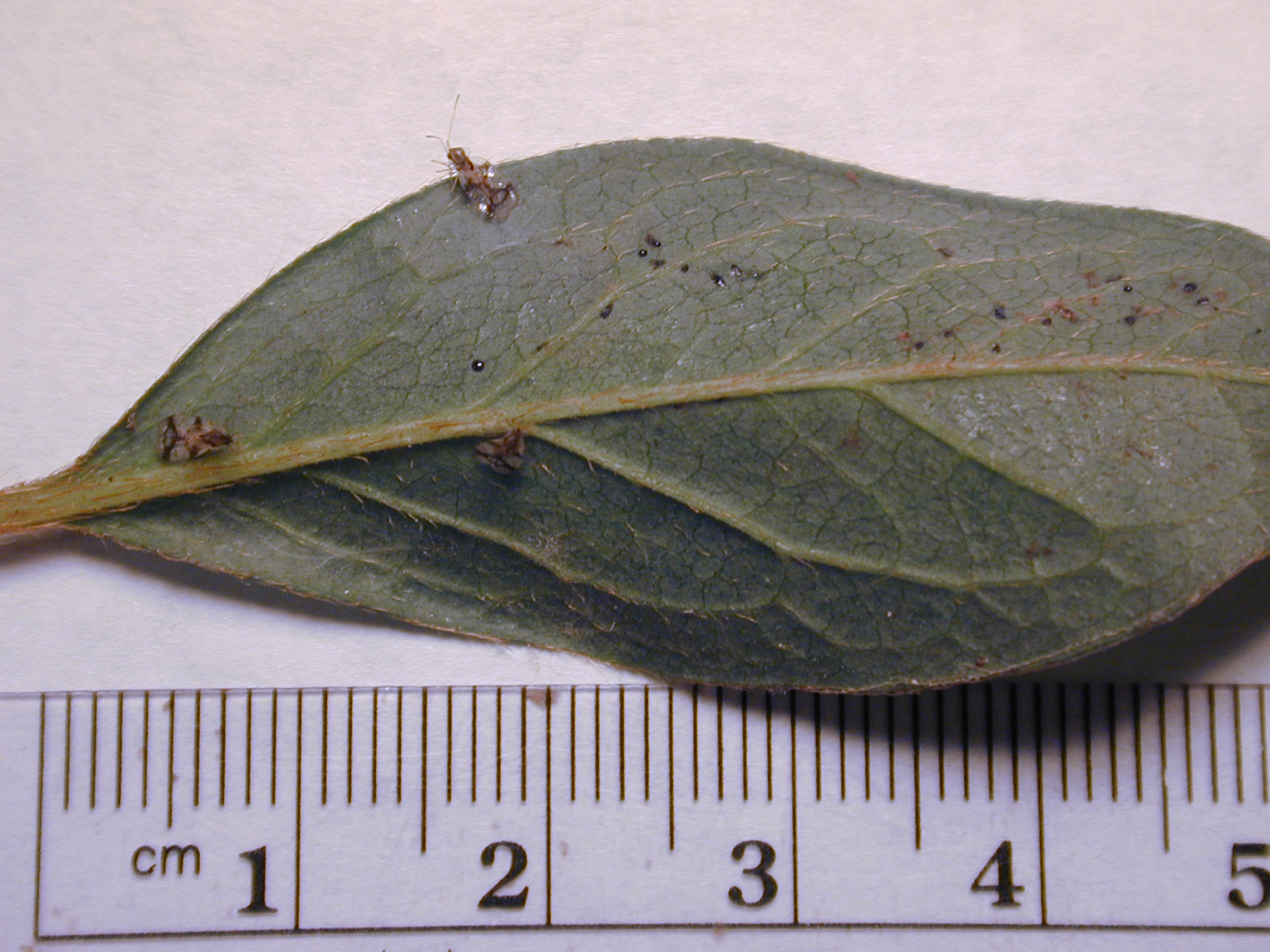
Azalea lace bug, Stephanitis pyrioides

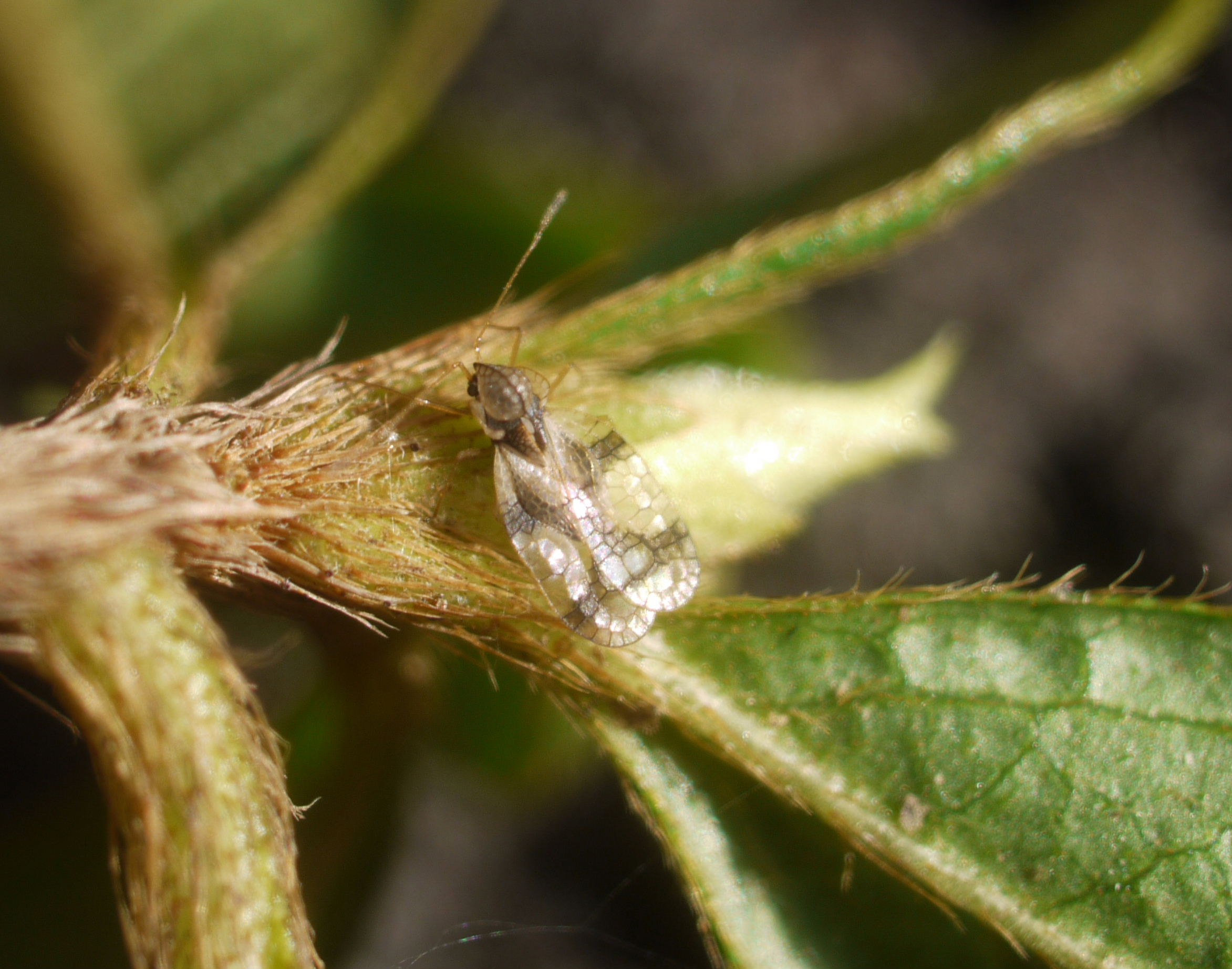
Azalea lace bug, Stephanitis pyrioides
