= Rhyparus =

Scientific classification
- Kingdom: Animalia
- Phylum: Arthropoda
- Clade: Pancrustacea
- Class: Insecta
- Order: Coleoptera
- Suborder: Polyphaga
- Infraorder: Scarabaeiformia
- Family: Scarabaeidae
- Subfamily: Aphodiinae
- Tribe: Rhyparini
- Genus: Rhyparus; Westwood, 1845

Synonyms
- Antrisis Pascoe, 1866; Rhyparus Agassiz, 1846; Ryparus Westwood, 1845; Ryparus Dejean, 1833

Genus of beetles

Rhyparus is a genus of beetles of the family Scarabaeidae.

== Species ==
- Rhyparus accessoricostatus Mencl, Rakovič & Král, 2013
- Rhyparus adebratti Bordat, 1996
- Rhyparus anichtchenkoi Minkina, 2023
- Rhyparus annamariae Minkina, 2017
- Rhyparus anneae Stebnicka, 1998
- Rhyparus apoensis Ochi & Kakizoe, 2021
- Rhyparus apomontanus Ochi & Kakizoe, 2021
- Rhyparus approximans Fairmaire, 1893
- Rhyparus argopuroensis Minkina & Jákl, 2024
- Rhyparus azumai Nakane, 1956
- Rhyparus bacanensis Minkina, Anichtchenko, Vasiljeva & Skelley, 2022
- Rhyparus baliensis Minkina & Jákl, 2024
- Rhyparus banyuwangiensis Minkina, 2026
- Rhyparus baracatanensis Ochi & Kakizoe, 2021
- Rhyparus barclayi Masumoto, Ochi & Ho, 2019
- Rhyparus basilanensis Ochi & Kakizoe, 2021
- Rhyparus birmanicus Fairmaire, 1897
- Rhyparus blantoni Cartwright & Woodruff, 1969
- Rhyparus borneensis Minkina & Jákl, 2024
- Rhyparus breviceps Paulian, 1984
- Rhyparus burckhardti Paulian, 1989
- Rhyparus buruensis Minkina, Anichtchenko, Vasiljeva & Skelley, 2022
- Rhyparus chimalapensis Mora-Aguilar & Delgado, 2019
- Rhyparus chinensis Balthasar, 1952
- Rhyparus clavipes Arrow, 1935
- Rhyparus comorianus Fairmaire, 1896
- Rhyparus costaricensis Cartwright & Woodruff, 1969
- Rhyparus crockerrangensis Minkina, 2026
- Rhyparus cucullatus Skelley & Smith, 2024
- Rhyparus danielssoni Bordat, 1996
- Rhyparus denieri (Martinez, 1950)
- Rhyparus denticollis Fairmaire, 1893
- Rhyparus desjardinsi Westwood, 1847
- Rhyparus edelmani Minkina, 2026
- Rhyparus edieae Stebnicka, 1998
- Rhyparus fijiensis Minkina, Anichtchenko, Vasiljeva & Skelley, 2022
- Rhyparus flavohirtus Anichtchenko, Minkina, Vasiljeva & Medina, 2021
- Rhyparus garo Minkina & Jákl, 2024
- Rhyparus gracilis Arrow, 1905
- Rhyparus guadalcanalensis Minkina, Skelley, Jákl, Král & Li, 2025
- Rhyparus halmaheraensis Minkina, 2026
- Rhyparus helophoroides Fairmaire, 1893
- Rhyparus henryi Stebnicka, 1998
- Rhyparus hexadentatus Skelley & Smith, 2024
- Rhyparus huaphanensis Ochi, Kon & Kawahara, 2019
- Rhyparus ifugaoensis Ochi & Kakizoe, 2021
- Rhyparus ironensis Stebnicka & Howden, 1996
- Rhyparus isidroi Cartwright & Woodruff, 1969
- Rhyparus jakli Minkina & Anichtchenko, 2022
- Rhyparus javanus Minkina & Jákl, 2024
- Rhyparus kazirangensis Minkina & Jákl, 2024
- Rhyparus kinabalu Paulian, 1989
- Rhyparus kitanoi Miyake, 1982
- Rhyparus klapperichorum Paulian, 1983
- Rhyparus krikkeni Minkina, 2026
- Rhyparus kudrnai Mencl & Rakovič, 2013
- Rhyparus laosensis Ochi, Kon & Kawahara, 2018
- Rhyparus loebli Paulian, 1983
- Rhyparus loughlini Skelley & Smith, 2024
- Rhyparus luzonensis Ochi & Kakizoe, 2021
- Rhyparus magnus Schmidt, 1911
- Rhyparus malaitaensis Minkina, Skelley, Jákl, Král & Li, 2025
- Rhyparus merkli Minkina & Anichtchenko, 2022
- Rhyparus mexicanus Cartwright & Woodruff, 1969
- Rhyparus micros Bordat, 1996
- Rhyparus mindanaoensis Anichtchenko, Minkina, Vasiljeva & Medina, 2021
- Rhyparus minor Paulian, 1989
- Rhyparus mokaiensis Stebnicka, 1998
- Rhyparus multipunctatus Paulian, 1984
- Rhyparus myslenickorum Minkina, 2019
- Rhyparus nahangensis Minkina & Král, 2022
- Rhyparus negrosensis Ochi & Kakizoe, 2021
- Rhyparus nepalensis Balthasar, 1971
- Rhyparus nilgirensis Arrow, 1909
- Rhyparus obiensis Minkina & Jákl, 2024
- Rhyparus obsoletus Fairmaire, 1893
- Rhyparus occidentalis (Paulian, 1990)
- Rhyparus opacus Cartwright & Woodruff, 1969
- Rhyparus paraloebli Ochi, Kon & Kawahara, 2018
- Rhyparus paraphilippinensis Ochi & Kakizoe, 2021
- Rhyparus peninsularis Arrow, 1905
- Rhyparus philippinensis Arrow, 1905
- Rhyparus platypygus Skelley & Smith, 2024
- Rhyparus pseudominor Bordat, 1996
- Rhyparus pteronellus Skelley & Smith, 2024
- Rhyparus punctithoracicus Ochi, Kon & Bai, 2019
- Rhyparus rugatus Arrow, 1935
- Rhyparus saundersi (Pascoe, 1866)
- Rhyparus schachti Balthasar, 1971
- Rhyparus schoolmeestersi Ochi, Kon & Kawahara, 2018
- Rhyparus sculpturatus Cartwright & Woodruff, 1969
- Rhyparus semikitanoi Ochi, Kon & Kawahara, 2018
- Rhyparus sepikensis Stebnicka, 1998
- Rhyparus sinewitensis Stebnicka, 1998
- Rhyparus snizeki Mencl & Rakovič, 2013
- Rhyparus sogai Paulian, 1958
- Rhyparus spangleri Cartwright & Woodruff, 1969
- Rhyparus spilmani Cartwright & Chalumeau, 1977
- Rhyparus stebnickae Minkina, Anichtchenko, Vasiljeva & Skelley, 2022
- Rhyparus striatus Arrow, 1935
- Rhyparus sulawesiensis Minkina, Jákl & Bezděk, 2023
- Rhyparus sumatrensis Fairmaire, 1893
- Rhyparus suspiciosus Cartwright & Woodruff, 1969
- Rhyparus suturalis Schmidt, 1911
- Rhyparus telnovietbarclayi Minkina & Jákl, 2024
- Rhyparus thailandicus Masumoto & Ochi, 2018
- Rhyparus vanuatuensis Skelley & Minkina, 2025
- Rhyparus verrucosus Schmidt, 1917
- Rhyparus vietnamicus Ochi, Kusui & Pham, 2018
- Rhyparus vitikaboureki Mencl & Rakovič, 2013
- Rhyparus wushensis Ochi & Masumoto, 2018
- Rhyparus xanthi (Frivaldszky, 1883)
- Rhyparus yangi Ochi, Kon & Bai, 2019
- Rhyparus zayasi Cartwright & Woodruff, 1969
