= Oscar Ling Cartwright =

American entomologist (1900–1983)

- Born: April 12, 1990
- Died: March 21, 1983 (aged 82)
- Education: Allegheny College (BS, 1923); Ohio State University (MA, 1925)
- Scientific career
- Fields: Entomology

Oscar Ling Cartwright (April 12, 1900 – March 21, 1983) was an American entomologist who specialized in scarab beetles. He was Associate Curator of Entomology and the head of the Division of Coleoptera at the Smithsonian Institution 1948-1963. He is commemorated in the scarab genus Cartwrightia as well as 16 insect species.
