= List of Tingini genera =

This is a list of 256 genera in the tribe Tingini.

== Tingini genera ==
- Abdastartus Distant, 1910
- Acalypta Westwood, 1840
- Acanthocheila Stål, 1858
- Acanthotingis Monte, 1940
- Aconchus Horváth, 1905
- Acysta Champion, 1898
- Aeipeplus Drake and Ruhoff, 1962
- Aeithauma Drake and Ruhoff, 1965
- Aeopelys Drake and Ruhoff, 1965
- Aepycysta Drake and Bondar, 1932
- Aepykorys Drake and Ruhoff, 1965
- Aframixia Drake and Ruhoff, 1960
- Afrochila Duarte Rodrigues, 1980
- Afrotingis Drake and Hill, 1964
- Agachila Drake and Gómez-Menor, 1954
- Agaotingis Drake, 1954
- Aglotingis Drake, 1954
- Agramma Stephens, 1829
- Aidoneus Distant, 1909
- Alinotingis Duarte Rodrigues, 1992
- Alloiothucha Drake, 1927
- Allotingis Drake, 1930
- Alveotingis Osborn & Drake, 1916
- Amberobyrsa Heiss, 2009
- Amblystira Stål, 1873
- Ambotingis Drake and Ruhoff, 1960
- Ambycysta Drake and Hurd, 1945
- Ammianus Distant, 1903
- Angolotingis Drake, 1955
- Angolusa Drake, 1958
- Aphelotingis Drake, 1948
- Aristobyrsa Drake and Poor, 1937
- Arushia Drake, 1951
- Asperotingis Péricart, 2000
- Atheas Champion, 1898
- Aulotingis Drake and Poor, 1943
- Australotingis Hacker, 1927
- Axiokersos Distant, 1909
- Baeochila Drake and Poor, 1937
- Baeotingis Drake and Poor, 1939
- Baichila Drake and Slater, 1955
- Bako Schouteden, 1923
- Banahaona Drake and Ruhoff, 1961
- Belenus Distant, 1909
- Berotingis Drake, 1956
- Birabena Drake and Hurd, 1945
- Bunia Schouteden, 1955
- Bunotingis Drake, 1948
- Cadmilos Distant, 1909
- Caffrocysta Duarte Rodrigues, 1982
- Callithrincus Horváth, 1925
- Caloloma Drake and Bruner, 1924
- Calotingis Drake, 1918
- Campylosteira Fieber, 1844
- Campylotingis Drake and Bondar, 1932
- Cantinona Distant, 1913
- Carvalhotingis Froeschner, 1995
- Catoplatus Spinola, 1837
- Celantia Distant, 1903
- Cephalidiosus Guilbert, 1999
- Ceratinoderma Stål, 1873
- Ceratotingis Montemayor, 2008
- Cetiothucha Drake and Ruhoff, 1965
- Chorotingioites Wappler, 2003
- Chorotingis Drake, 1961
- Cochlochila Stål, 1873
- Codotingis Drake, 1942
- Coleopterodes Philippi, 1864
- Collinutius Distant, 1903
- Compseuta Stål, 1873
- Conchotingis Drake, 1954
- Congochila Drake, 1954
- Copium Thunberg, 1822
- Corinthus Distant, 1920
- Corycera Drake, 1922
- Corythaica Stål, 1873 (eggplant tingids)
- Corythauma Drake and Poor, 1939
- Corythotingis Drake and Poor, 1943
- Corythucha Stål, 1873
- Cottothucha Drake and Poor, 1941
- Cromerus Distant, 1902
- Cysteochila Stål, 1873
- Dasytingis Drake and Poor, 1936
- Derephysia Spinola, 1837
- Dichocysta Champion, 1898
- Diconocoris Mayr, 1865
- Dicrotingis Drake and Ruhoff, 1960
- Dictyla Stål, 1874
- Dictyonota Curtis, 1827
- Dictyotingis Drake, 1942
- Dicysta Champion, 1897
- Diplocysta Horváth, 1925
- Dulinius Distant, 1903
- Dyspharsa Drake and Hambleton, 1944
- Elasmognathus Fieber, 1844
- Elasmotropis Stål, 1874
- Engynoma Drake, 1942
- Engyotingis Drake and Ruhoff, 1961
- Eotingis Scudder, 1890
- Epimixia Kirkaldy, 1908
- Eritingis Drake and Ruhoff, 1962
- Esocampylia Hacker, 1929
- Eteoneus Distant, 1903
- Euahanes Distant, 1911
- Euaulana Drake, 1945
- Eurypharsa Stål, 1873
- Froggattia Froggatt, 1901
- Furcilliger Horváth, 1925
- Gabirobius Schouteden, 1955
- Galeatus Curtis, 1833
- Galotingis Duarte Rodrigues, 1980
- Gargaphia Stål, 1862
- Gitava Drake, 1948
- Gyalotingis Drake, 1960
- Gymnotingis Hacker, 1928
- Habrochila Horváth, 1912
- Haedacanthus Duarte Rodrigues, 1992
- Haedus Distant, 1904
- Hebetingis Drake, 1960
- Hegesidemus Distant, 1911
- Heissiella Péricart, 1984
- Henrikus Drake, 1955
- Hesperotingis Parshley, 1917
- Holophygdon Kirkaldy, 1908
- Hovatlas Schouteden, 1957
- Hurdchila Drake, 1953
- Hyalochiton Horváth, 1905
- Hybopharsa Hurd, 1946
- Hypsipyrgias Kirkaldy, 1908
- Hypsotingis Drake, 1960
- Idiocysta China, 1930
- Ildefonsus Distant, 1910
- Inoma Hacker, 1927
- Inonemia Drake, 1942
- Ischnotingis Horváth, 1925
- Ittolemma Symonds and Cassis, 2014
- Kalama Puton in Lethierry and Puton, 1876
- Kapiriella Schouteden, 1919
- Larotingis Drake, 1960
- Lasiacantha Stål, 1873
- Latitingis Péricart, 1985
- Lemurichila Duarte Rodrigues, 1992
- Leptobyrsa Stål, 1873
- Leptocysta Stål, 1873
- Leptodictya Stål, 1873
- Leptopharsa Stål, 1873
- Leptoptyx Drake and Ruhoff, 1965
- Leptoypha Stål, 1873
- Lepturga Stål, 1873
- Liotingis Drake, 1930
- Litadea China, 1924
- Longiscutella Livingstone and Jeyanthibai, 1995
- Lullius Distant, 1904
- Machairotingis Duarte Rodrigues, 1982
- Macrocorytha Stål, 1873
- Macrotingis Champion, 1897
- Madangocoris Péricart, 2000
- Mafa Hesse, 1925
- Magmara Péricart, 1977
- Malagasotingis B. Lis, 2009
- Malandiola Horváth, 1925
- Mecopharsa Drake, 1953
- Megalocysta Champion, 1897
- Melanorhopala Stål, 1873
- Metasalis Lee, 1971
- Monosteira Costa, 1863
- Mummius Horváth, 1910
- Naitingis Drake and Ruhoff, 1962
- Naochila Drake, 1957
- Neoplerochila Duarte Rodrigues, 1982
- Neotingis Drake, 1922
- Nesocypselas Kirkaldy, 1908
- Nesocysta Kirkaldy, 1908
- Nesotingis Drake, 1957
- Nethersia Horváth, 1925
- Niborskiana Montemayor, 2012
- Nobarnus Distant, 1920
- Nyctotingis Drake, 1922
- Oblongomorpha Wappler, 2003
- Octacysta Drake and Ruhoff, 1960
- Oedotingis Drake, 1942
- Oeocharis Drake and Ruhoff, 1965
- Ogygotingis Drake, 1948
- Olastrida Schouteden, 1956
- Omoplax Horváth, 1912
- Oncochila Stål, 1873
- Oncophysa Stål, 1873
- Onymochila Drake, 1948
- Orotingis Drake and Poor, 1941
- Ottoicus Drake, 1960
- Pachycysta Champion, 1898
- Palauella Drake, 1956
- Paracopium Distant, 1902
- Parada Horváth, 1925
- Paraleptoypha Duarte Rodrigues, 1980
- Paraperissonemia Duarte Rodrigues, 1980
- Paseala Schouteden, 1923
- Penottus Distant, 1903
- Perbrinckea Drake, 1956
- Perissonemia Drake and Poor, 1937
- Phaenotropis Horváth, 1906
- Phaeochila Drake and Hambleton, 1945
- Phymacysta Monte, 1942
- Physatocheila Fieber, 1844
- Placotingis Drake, 1960
- Planibyrsa Drake and Poor, 1937
- Platytingis Drake, 1925
- Plerochila Drake, 1954
- Pleseobyrsa Drake and Poor, 1937
- Pliobyrsa Drake and Hambleton, 1946
- Pogonostyla Drake, 1953
- Pontanus Distant, 1902
- Pseudacysta Blatchley, 1926
- Pseudohegesidemus B. Lis, 2001
- Pseudurentius Péricart, 1992
- Psilobyrsa Drake and Hambleton, 1935
- Radinacantha Hacker, 1929
- Raunotingis Duarte Rodrigues, 1980
- Recaredus Distant, 1909
- Sabestena Drake, 1944
- Sanazarius Distant, 1904
- Scymnotingis Drake, 1960
- Sinuessa Horváth, 1910
- Sisperonemia Duarte Rodrigues, 1987
- Sphaerista Kiritshenko, 1951
- Sphaerocysta Stål, 1873
- Stenocysta Champion, 1897
- Stephanitis Stål, 1873
- Stragulotingis Froeschner, 1969
- Stymnonotus Reuter, 1887
- Swaustraltingis Moir and Guilbert, 2012
- Tadelia Linnavuori, 1977
- Taichila Duarte Rodrigues, 1983
- Tanybyrsa Drake, 1942
- Tanytingis Drake, 1939
- Teleonemia Costa, 1864
- Therotingis Duarte Rodrigues, 2002
- Tigava Stål, 1858
- Tigavaria Drake, 1945
- Tingicesa Koçak and Kemal, 2010
- Tingis Fabricius, 1803
- Trachypeplus Horváth, 1926
- Tropicotingis Duarte Rodrigues, 1981
- Uhlerites Drake, 1927
- Ulocysta Drake and Hambleton, 1945
- Ulonemia Drake and Poor, 1937
- Ulotingis Drake and Hambleton, 1935
- Urentius Distant, 1903
- Vatiga Drake & Hambleton, 1946
- Xenotingis Drake, 1923
- Xynotingis Drake, 1928
- Ypsotingis Drake, 1947
- Zatingis Drake, 1928
- Zeiratingis Drake and Ruhoff, 1961
- Zelotingis Drake and Hambleton, 1946
- Zorotingis Drake and Ruhoff, 1961
