= Pontanus =

Pontanus may refer to:

- a Latin pen name of the German Lutheran pastor Michael Brüggemann (1583 – 1654)
- the Italian humanist Giovanni Gioviano Pontano, commonly known as Iovianus Pontanus
- Johan Isaksson Pontanus, author of the 1631 Rerum danicarum historia
- Pontanus (crater)
- Pontanus (bug), see List of Tingini genera
