= Alveotingis brevicornis =

Scientific classification
- Domain: Eukaryota
- Kingdom: Animalia
- Phylum: Arthropoda
- Class: Insecta
- Order: Hemiptera
- Suborder: Heteroptera
- Family: Tingidae
- Tribe: Tingini
- Genus: Alveotingis
- Species: A. brevicornis

Binomial name
- Alveotingis brevicornis Osborn & Drake, 1917

Species of true bug

Alveotingis brevicornis is a species of lace bug in the family Tingidae. It is found in North America.
