= Corythaica carinata =

Scientific classification
- Domain: Eukaryota
- Kingdom: Animalia
- Phylum: Arthropoda
- Class: Insecta
- Order: Hemiptera
- Suborder: Heteroptera
- Family: Tingidae
- Tribe: Tingini
- Genus: Corythaica
- Species: C. carinata

Binomial name
- Corythaica carinata Uhler, 1894

Species of true bug

Corythaica carinata is a species of lace bug in the family Tingidae. It is found in the Caribbean Sea, Central America, and North America.
