= Hesperotingis mississippiensis =

Scientific classification
- Domain: Eukaryota
- Kingdom: Animalia
- Phylum: Arthropoda
- Class: Insecta
- Order: Hemiptera
- Suborder: Heteroptera
- Family: Tingidae
- Tribe: Tingini
- Genus: Hesperotingis
- Species: H. mississippiensis

Binomial name
- Hesperotingis mississippiensis Drake, 1928

Species of true bug

Hesperotingis mississippiensis is a species of lace bug in the family Tingidae.
