= Acanthocheila armigera =

Scientific classification
- Domain: Eukaryota
- Kingdom: Animalia
- Phylum: Arthropoda
- Class: Insecta
- Order: Hemiptera
- Suborder: Heteroptera
- Family: Tingidae
- Tribe: Tingini
- Genus: Acanthocheila
- Species: A. armigera

Binomial name
- Acanthocheila armigera (Stal, 1858)

Synonyms
- Acanthocheila nigrescens Drake and Bondar, 1932; Monanthia armigera Stål, 1858

Species of true bug

Acanthocheila armigera is a species of lace bug in the family Tingidae. It is found in the Caribbean Sea, Central America, North America, and South America.
