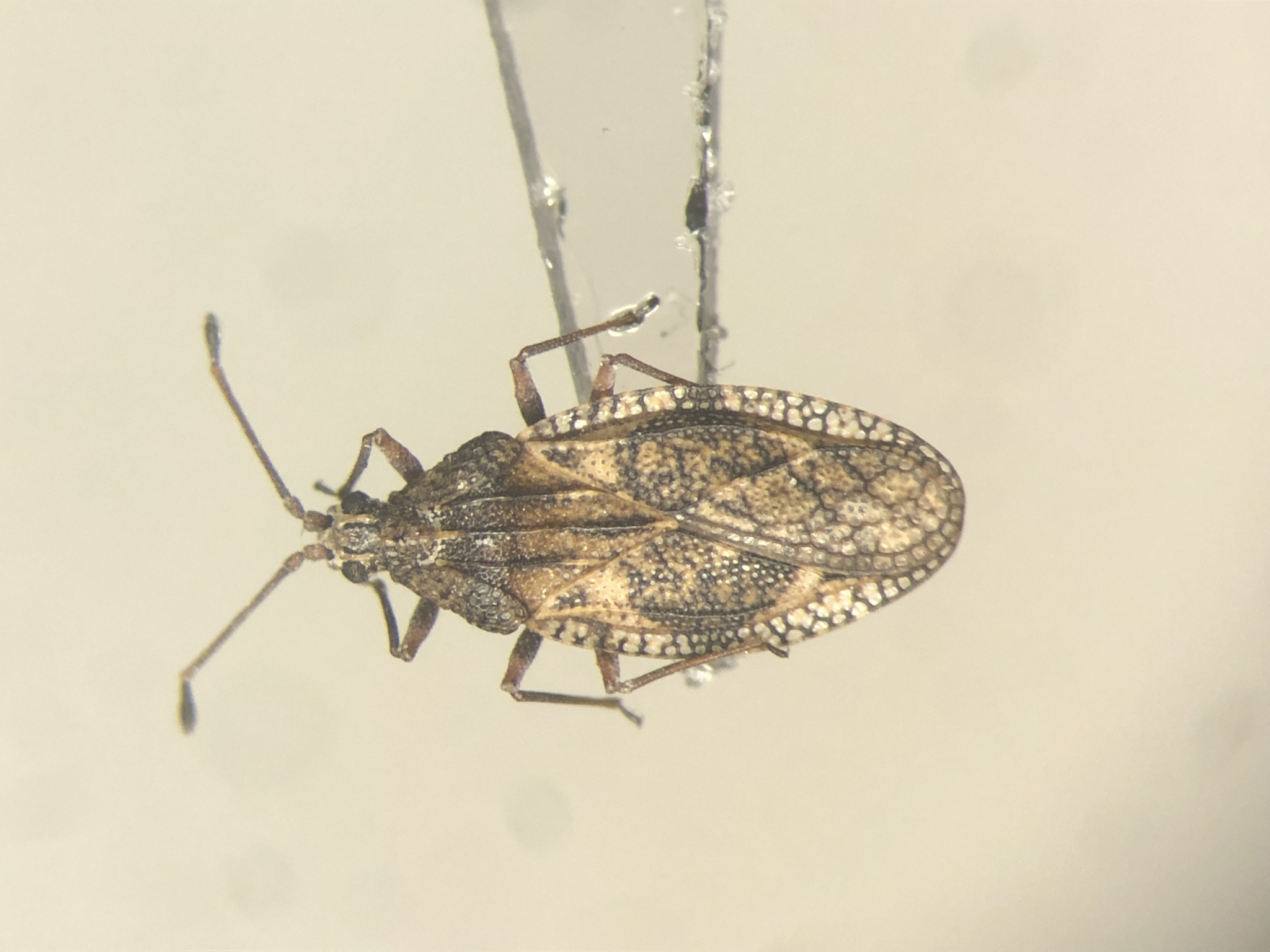

Scientific classification
- Domain: Eukaryota
- Kingdom: Animalia
- Phylum: Arthropoda
- Class: Insecta
- Order: Hemiptera
- Suborder: Heteroptera
- Family: Tingidae
- Tribe: Tingini
- Genus: Physatocheila
- Species: P. variegata

Binomial name
- Physatocheila variegata Parshley, 1916

= Physatocheila variegata =

Species of true bug

Physatocheila variegata is a species of lace bug in the family Tingidae. It is found in North America.

== Subspecies ==
These two subspecies belong to the species Physatocheila variegata:

- Physatocheila variegata ornata Van Duzee, 1917
- Physatocheila variegata variegata Parshley, 1916
