= Atheas mimeticus =

Scientific classification
- Domain: Eukaryota
- Kingdom: Animalia
- Phylum: Arthropoda
- Class: Insecta
- Order: Hemiptera
- Suborder: Heteroptera
- Family: Tingidae
- Tribe: Tingini
- Genus: Atheas
- Species: A. mimeticus

Binomial name
- Atheas mimeticus Heidemann, 1909

Species of true bug

Atheas mimeticus is a species of lace bug in the family Tingidae. It is found in North America.
