= Gargaphia angulata =

Scientific classification
- Domain: Eukaryota
- Kingdom: Animalia
- Phylum: Arthropoda
- Class: Insecta
- Order: Hemiptera
- Suborder: Heteroptera
- Family: Tingidae
- Tribe: Tingini
- Genus: Gargaphia
- Species: G. angulata

Binomial name
- Gargaphia angulata Heidemann, 1899

Species of true bug

Gargaphia angulata is a species of lace bug in the family Tingidae. It is found in North America.
