= Mafa (disambiguation) =

Mafa is a local government area of Borno State, Nigeria.

Mafa or MAFA may also refer to:

- KLRG1, a gene sometimes called MAFA in rats
- Transcription factor MafA, a protein encoded by the gene MAFA
- Mafa (bug), a genus of lace bugs
- Mafa people, an ethnic group in northern Cameroon and eastern Nigeria
- Mafa language, an Afro-Asiatic language spoken in northern Cameroon and eastern Nigeria
- Manchester Academy of Fine Arts in England
- Melaka Football Association, a football association in Malaysia
- Victorian Amateur Football Association, previously the Metropolitan Amateur Football Association, an Australian rules football competition
