= Calotingis knighti =

Scientific classification
- Domain: Eukaryota
- Kingdom: Animalia
- Phylum: Arthropoda
- Class: Insecta
- Order: Hemiptera
- Suborder: Heteroptera
- Family: Tingidae
- Tribe: Tingini
- Genus: Calotingis
- Species: C. knighti

Binomial name
- Calotingis knighti Drake, 1918

Species of true bug

Calotingis knighti is a species of lace bug in the family Tingidae. It is found in Central America and North America.
