= Hesperotingis antennata =

Scientific classification
- Domain: Eukaryota
- Kingdom: Animalia
- Phylum: Arthropoda
- Class: Insecta
- Order: Hemiptera
- Suborder: Heteroptera
- Family: Tingidae
- Tribe: Tingini
- Genus: Hesperotingis
- Species: H. antennata

Binomial name
- Hesperotingis antennata Parshley, 1917

Species of true bug

Hesperotingis antennata is a species of lace bug in the family Tingidae. It is found in North America.

== Subspecies ==
These two subspecies belong to the species Hesperotingis antennata:

- Hesperotingis antennata antennata Parshley, 1917
- Hesperotingis antennata borealis Parshley, 1917
