= Leptodictya =

Scientific classification
- Kingdom: Animalia
- Phylum: Arthropoda
- Clade: Pancrustacea
- Class: Insecta
- Order: Hemiptera
- Suborder: Heteroptera
- Family: Tingidae
- Subfamily: Tinginae
- Tribe: Tingini
- Genus: Leptodictya; Stål, 1873

Subgenera
- Leptodictya (Hanuala) Kirkaldy, 1905; Leptodictya (Leptodictya) Stål, 1873

Genus of true bugs

Leptodictya is a genus of lace bugs in the family Tingidae. There are at least 60 described species in Leptodictya.

== Species ==
These 60 species belong to the genus Leptodictya:

- Leptodictya approximata (Stal, 1858)
- Leptodictya archboldi Froeschner, 1968
- Leptodictya austrina Drake & Hambleton, 1939
- Leptodictya bambusae Drake, 1918
- Leptodictya bredini Froeschner, 1968
- Leptodictya championi Drake, 1928
- Leptodictya circumcincta Champion, 1897
- Leptodictya colombiana Drake, 1928
- Leptodictya comes Drake & Hambleton, 1938
- Leptodictya comitis Drake & Hambleton, 1938
- Leptodictya cretata Champion, 1897
- Leptodictya decor Drake & Hambleton, 1945
- Leptodictya decoris Drake & Hambleton, 1945
- Leptodictya dilatata Monte, 1942
- Leptodictya dohrni (Stal, 1858)
- Leptodictya dola Drake & Hambleton, 1939
- Leptodictya ecuadoris Drake & Hambleton, 1945
- Leptodictya elitha Drake & Ruhoff, 1962
- Leptodictya evidens Drake, 1928
- Leptodictya faceta Monte, 1943
- Leptodictya formosatis Drake, 1928
- Leptodictya formositis Drake, 1928
- Leptodictya fraterna Monte, 1941
- Leptodictya fusca Drake
- Leptodictya fuscipes Froeschner, 1989
- Leptodictya fuscocincta (Stal, 1858)
- Leptodictya galerita Drake, 1942
- Leptodictya grandatis Drake, 1931
- Leptodictya intermedia Monte, 1943
- Leptodictya laidis Drake & Hambleton, 1945
- Leptodictya leinahoni (Kirkaldy, 1905)
- Leptodictya lepida (Stal, 1858)
- Leptodictya litigiosa Monte, 1940
- Leptodictya lucida Drake & Hambleton, 1945
- Leptodictya luculenta Drake, 1928
- Leptodictya ludica Drake & Hambleton
- Leptodictya madelinae Drake, 1928
- Leptodictya madra Drake & Hambleton, 1939
- Leptodictya nema Drake & Hambleton, 1939
- Leptodictya nicholi Drake, 1926
- Leptodictya nigra Monte, 1941
- Leptodictya nigrosis Drake & Hambleton, 1945
- Leptodictya nota Drake & Hambleton, 1939
- Leptodictya ochropa (Stal, 1858)
- Leptodictya olyrae Drake, 1931
- Leptodictya parilis Drake & Hambleton, 1945
- Leptodictya paspalii Drake & Hambleton, 1934
- Leptodictya paulana Drake & Hambleton, 1944
- Leptodictya perita Drake, 1935
- Leptodictya plana Heidemann, 1913
- Leptodictya simulans Heidemann, 1913
- Leptodictya sinaloana Drake, 1954
- Leptodictya socorrona Drake, 1948
- Leptodictya sodalatis Drake, 1928
- Leptodictya solita Drake & Hambleton, 1938
- Leptodictya tabida (Herrich-Schaeffer, 1840)
- Leptodictya tegeticula Monte, 1943
- Leptodictya venezolana Monte, 1940
- Leptodictya vulgata Drake, 1928
- Leptodictya williamsi Drake, 1928
