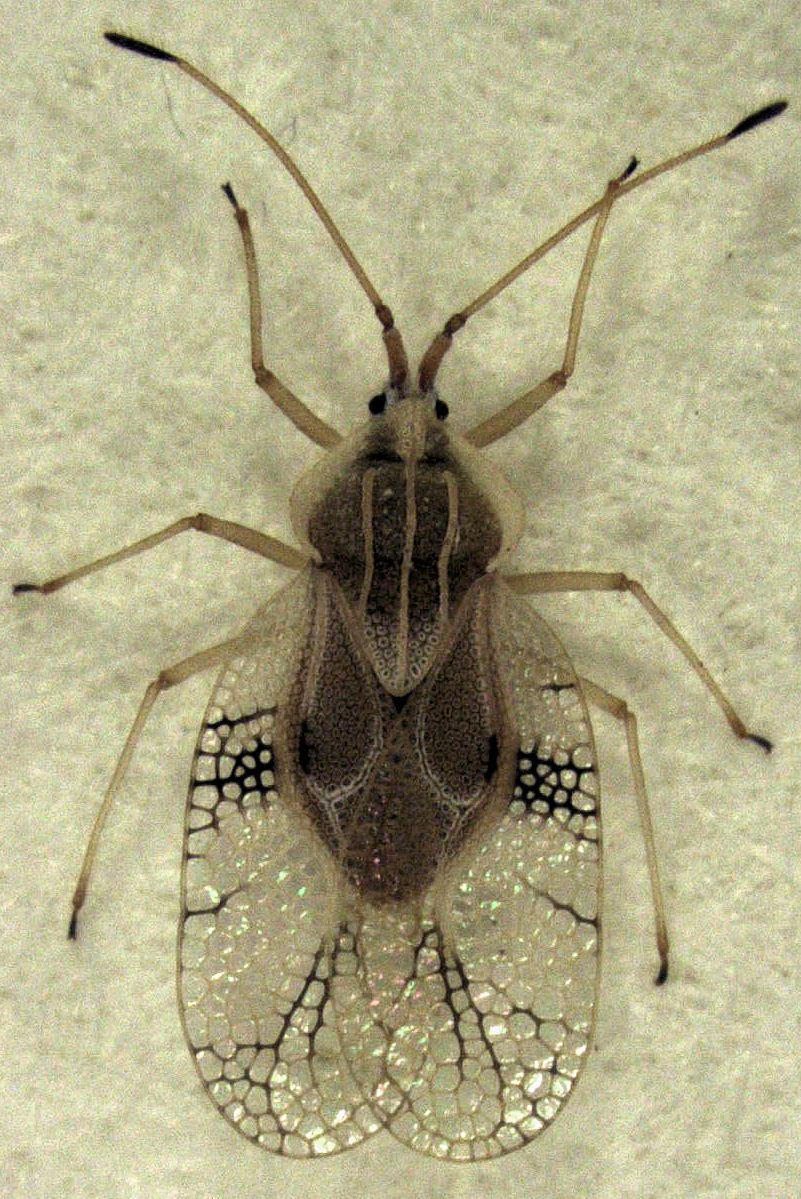
- Gargaphia decoris

Scientific classification
- Kingdom: Animalia
- Phylum: Arthropoda
- Clade: Pancrustacea
- Class: Insecta
- Order: Hemiptera
- Suborder: Heteroptera
- Family: Tingidae
- Subfamily: Tinginae
- Tribe: Tingini
- Genus: Gargaphia; Stål, 1862

= Gargaphia =

Genus of true bugs

Gargaphia is a genus of lace bugs in the family Tingidae. There are more than 70 described species in Gargaphia.

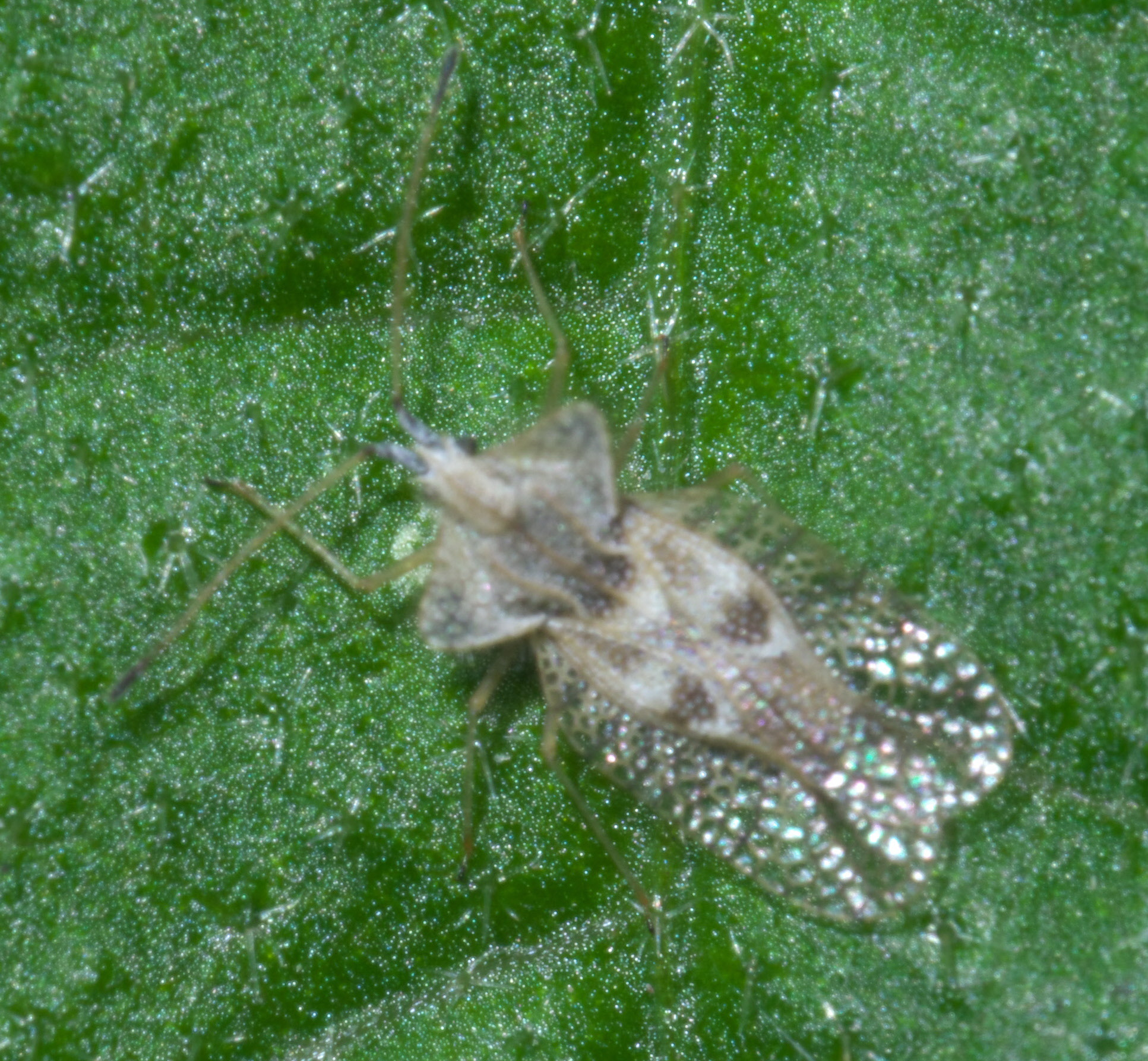
Gargaphia solani

== Species ==
These 79 species belong to the genus Gargaphia:

- Gargaphia acmonis Drake & Hambleton, 1945
- Gargaphia albescens Drake, 1917
- Gargaphia amorphae (Walsh, 1864)
- Gargaphia angulata Heidemann, 1899
- Gargaphia argillacea Monte, 1943
- Gargaphia arizonica Drake & Carvalho, 1944
- Gargaphia balli Drake & Carvalho, 1944
- Gargaphia bimaculata Parshley, 1920
- Gargaphia bolivariana
- Gargaphia boliviana Monte, 1947
- Gargaphia brunfelsiae Monte, 1938
- Gargaphia carinata Gibson
- Gargaphia comosa Monte, 1941
- Gargaphia concursa Drake, 1930
- Gargaphia condensa Gibson, 1919
- Gargaphia condesa Gibson
- Gargaphia costalimai Monte, 1938
- Gargaphia crotonae Drake & Hambleton, 1938
- Gargaphia deceptiva (Drake & Bruner, 1924)
- Gargaphia decoris Drake, 1931
- Gargaphia differatis Drake, 1935
- Gargaphia dissortis Drake, 1930
- Gargaphia fasciata Stål, 1873
- Gargaphia flexuosa (Stål, 1858)
- Gargaphia formosa (Stål, 1858)
- Gargaphia gentilis Van Duzee, 1923
- Gargaphia gracilenta Drake, 1928
- Gargaphia gracilentis Drake
- Gargaphia holoxantha Monte, 1942
- Gargaphia implicata Drake & Hambleton, 1940
- Gargaphia inca Monte, 1943
- Gargaphia insularis Van Duzee, 1923
- Gargaphia interrogationis Monte, 1941
- Gargaphia iridescens Champion, 1897
- Gargaphia iridiscens Champion
- Gargaphia jucunda Drake & Hambleton, 1942
- Gargaphia lanei Monte, 1940
- Gargaphia lasciva Gibson
- Gargaphia limata Drake & Poor
- Gargaphia lunulata (Mayr, 1865)
- Gargaphia magna Gibson
- Gargaphia manni Drake & Hurd, 1945
- Gargaphia mexicana Drake, 1922
- Gargaphia mirabilis Monte, 1938
- Gargaphia munda (Stål, 1858)
- Gargaphia neivai Drake & Poor, 1940
- Gargaphia nexilis Drake & Hambleton, 1940
- Gargaphia nigrinervis Stål, 1873
- Gargaphia nociva Drake & Hambleton, 1940
- Gargaphia obliqua Stål, 1873
- Gargaphia opacula Uhler, 1893
- Gargaphia opima Drake, 1931
- Gargaphia oreades Drake, 1928
- Gargaphia oregona Drake & Hurd, 1945
- Gargaphia panamensis Champion, 1897
- Gargaphia paraguayensis Drake & Poor, 1940
- Gargaphia patria (Drake & Hambleton, 1938)
- Gargaphia patricia (Stål, 1862)
- Gargaphia paula Drake, 1939
- Gargaphia penningtoni Drake, 1928
- Gargaphia sanchezi Froeschner, 1972
- Gargaphia schulzei Drake, 1954
- Gargaphia seorsa Drake & Hambleton, 1945
- Gargaphia serjaniae Drake & Hambleton, 1938
- Gargaphia shelfordi Drake & Hambleton, 1944
- Gargaphia socorrona Drake, 1954
- Gargaphia solani Heidemann, 1914 (eggplant lace bug)
- Gargaphia sororia Hussey, 1957
- Gargaphia stigma Monte, 1940
- Gargaphia subpilosa Berg, 1879
- Gargaphia tiliae (Walsh, 1864) (basswood lace bug)
- Gargaphia torresi Costa Lima, 1922
- Gargaphia trichoptera Stål, 1873
- Gargaphia tuthilli Drake & Carvalho, 1944
- Gargaphia valderioi Drake
- Gargaphia valerioi Drake, 1941
- Gargaphia vanduzeei Gibson, 1919
- Gargaphia vanduzzeei Gibson, 1917
- Gargaphia venosa Drake & Poor, 1942
