= Gargaphia iridescens =

Scientific classification
- Kingdom: Animalia
- Phylum: Arthropoda
- Class: Insecta
- Order: Hemiptera
- Suborder: Heteroptera
- Family: Tingidae
- Tribe: Tingini
- Genus: Gargaphia
- Species: G. iridescens

Binomial name
- Gargaphia iridescens Champion, 1897

Species of true bug

Gargaphia iridescens is a species of lace bug in the family Tingidae. It is found in Central America, North America, and South America.
