= Galeatus spinifrons =

Scientific classification
- Domain: Eukaryota
- Kingdom: Animalia
- Phylum: Arthropoda
- Class: Insecta
- Order: Hemiptera
- Suborder: Heteroptera
- Family: Tingidae
- Tribe: Tingini
- Genus: Galeatus
- Species: G. spinifrons

Binomial name
- Galeatus spinifrons (Fallén, 1807)

Synonyms
- Tingis spinifrons Fallén, 1807

Species of true bug

Galeatus spinifrons is a species of lace bug in the family Tingidae. It is found in Europe and Northern Asia (excluding China) and North America.
