= Corythaica =

Scientific classification
- Kingdom: Animalia
- Phylum: Arthropoda
- Clade: Pancrustacea
- Class: Insecta
- Order: Hemiptera
- Suborder: Heteroptera
- Family: Tingidae
- Subfamily: Tinginae
- Tribe: Tingini
- Genus: Corythaica; Stål, 1873

Synonyms
- Dolichocysta Champion, 1898

Genus of true bugs

Corythaica is a genus of eggplant tingids in the family Tingidae. There are more than 20 described species in Corythaica.

== Species ==
These 24 species belong to the genus Corythaica:

- Corythaica acuta (Drake, 1917)
- Corythaica bellula Torre-Bueno, 1917
- Corythaica bosqi Monte, 1938
- Corythaica caestri (Reed, 1900)
- Corythaica carinata Uhler, 1894
- Corythaica constricta Osborn & Drake
- Corythaica costata Gibson, 1919
- Corythaica cucullata (Berg, 1879)
- Corythaica cyathicollis (Costa, 1864)
- Corythaica cytharina (Butler, 1877)
- Corythaica darwiniana Drake & Froeschner, 1967
- Corythaica dellapei Montemayor & Melo, 2012
- Corythaica globifera
- Corythaica leprosa Montemayor & Melo, 2012
- Corythaica misionera Ajmat, 2000
- Corythaica monacha (Stål, 1858)
- Corythaica passiflorae (Berg, 1884)
- Corythaica pavonia Ajmat, 2000
- Corythaica planaris Uhler, 1893
- Corythaica saltensis Montemayor & Melo, 2012
- Corythaica smithi Drake, 1921
- Corythaica umbrosa (Monte, 1938)
- Corythaica venusta (Champion, 1898)
- Corythaica wolfiana Drake & Froeschner, 1967
