= Gargaphia tiliae =

Scientific classification
- Kingdom: Animalia
- Phylum: Arthropoda
- Class: Insecta
- Order: Hemiptera
- Suborder: Heteroptera
- Family: Tingidae
- Tribe: Tingini
- Genus: Gargaphia
- Species: G. tiliae

Binomial name
- Gargaphia tiliae (Walsh, 1864)

Synonyms
- Tingis tiliae Walsh, 1864

Species of true bug

Gargaphia tiliae, known generally as the basswood lace bug or linden lace bug, is a species of lace bug in the family Tingidae. It is found in Central America and North America.
