= Physatocheila brevirostris =

Scientific classification
- Domain: Eukaryota
- Kingdom: Animalia
- Phylum: Arthropoda
- Class: Insecta
- Order: Hemiptera
- Suborder: Heteroptera
- Family: Tingidae
- Tribe: Tingini
- Genus: Physatocheila
- Species: P. brevirostris

Binomial name
- Physatocheila brevirostris Osborn & Drake, 1916

Species of true bug

Physatocheila brevirostris is a species of lace bug in the family Tingidae. It is found in North America.
