= Vatiga illudens =

Scientific classification
- Domain: Eukaryota
- Kingdom: Animalia
- Phylum: Arthropoda
- Class: Insecta
- Order: Hemiptera
- Suborder: Heteroptera
- Family: Tingidae
- Tribe: Tingini
- Genus: Vatiga
- Species: V. illudens

Binomial name
- Vatiga illudens (Drake, 1922)

Synonyms
- Vatiga celebrata (Drake, 1928); Vatiga variana Drake and Hambleton, 1946

Species of true bug

Vatiga illudens, the cassava lace bug, is a species of lace bug in the family Tingidae. It is found in the Caribbean and South America.
