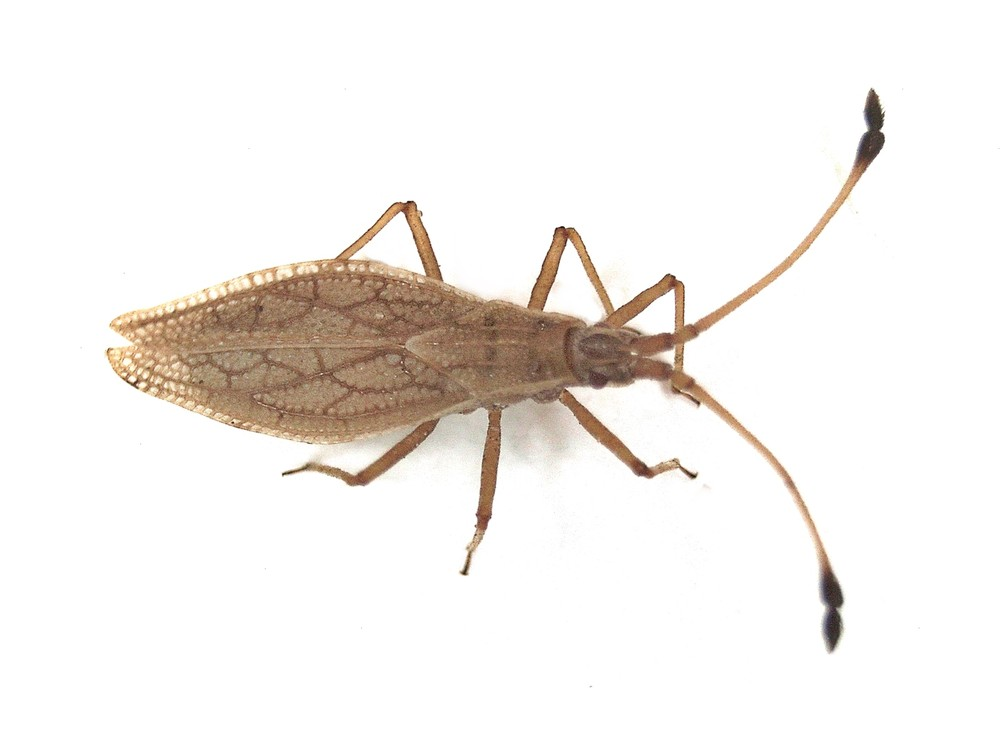

Scientific classification
- Kingdom: Animalia
- Phylum: Arthropoda
- Clade: Pancrustacea
- Class: Insecta
- Order: Hemiptera
- Suborder: Heteroptera
- Family: Tingidae
- Tribe: Tingini
- Genus: Melanorhopala
- Species: M. clavata

Binomial name
- Melanorhopala clavata (Stål, 1873)

Synonyms
- Tingis clavata Stål, 1873

= Melanorhopala clavata =

Species of true bug

Melanorhopala clavata is a species of lace bug in the family Tingidae. It is found in North America.
