= Gargaphia condensa =

Scientific classification
- Kingdom: Animalia
- Phylum: Arthropoda
- Class: Insecta
- Order: Hemiptera
- Suborder: Heteroptera
- Family: Tingidae
- Tribe: Tingini
- Genus: Gargaphia
- Species: G. condensa

Binomial name
- Gargaphia condensa Gibson, 1919

Species of true bug

Gargaphia condensa is a species of lace bug in the family Tingidae which lives in North America.
