= Gargaphia arizonica =

Scientific classification
- Kingdom: Animalia
- Phylum: Arthropoda
- Clade: Pancrustacea
- Class: Insecta
- Order: Hemiptera
- Suborder: Heteroptera
- Family: Tingidae
- Tribe: Tingini
- Genus: Gargaphia
- Species: G. arizonica

Binomial name
- Gargaphia arizonica Drake & Carvalho, 1944

Species of true bug

Gargaphia arizonica is a species of lace bug in the family Tingidae. It is found in Central America and North America. The species is known to feed on Solanum elaeagnifolium.
