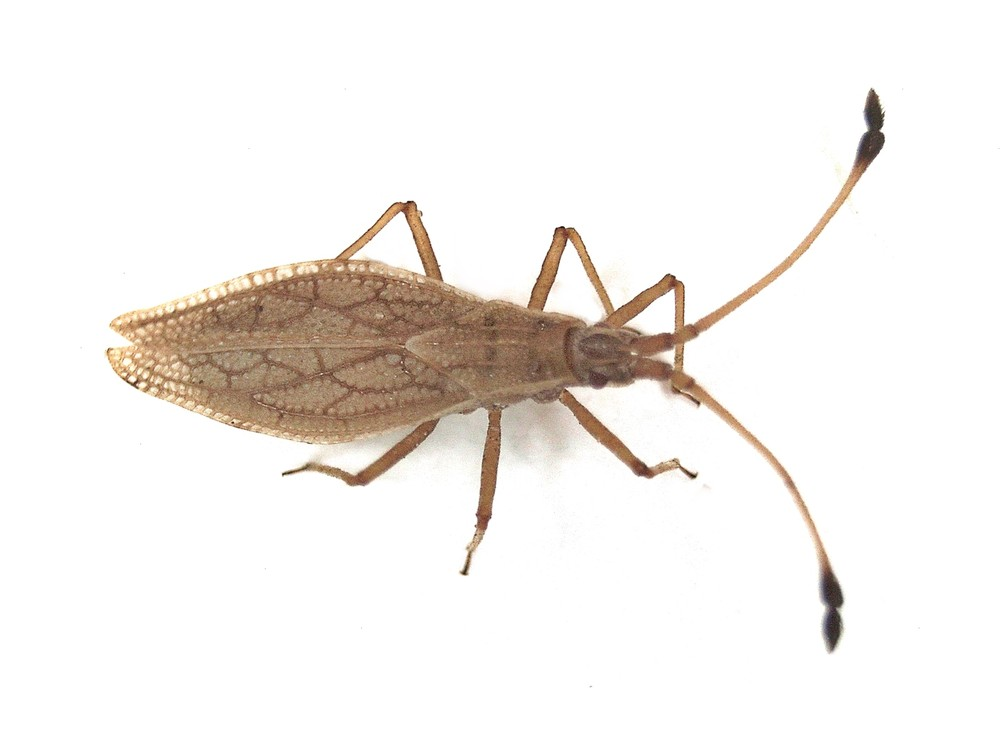
- Lacebug melanorhopala clavata (Tingidae); one of approximately five species of melanorhopala

Scientific classification
- Kingdom: Animalia
- Phylum: Arthropoda
- Clade: Pancrustacea
- Class: Insecta
- Order: Hemiptera
- Suborder: Heteroptera
- Family: Tingidae
- Subfamily: Tinginae
- Tribe: Tingini
- Genus: Melanorhopala; Stål, 1873

= Melanorhopala =

Genus of true bugs

Melanorhopala is a genus of lace bugs in the family Tingidae. There are about five described species in Melanorhopala.

== Species ==
These five species belong to the genus Melanorhopala:

- Melanorhopala balli Drake, 1928
- Melanorhopala clavata (Stål, 1873)
- Melanorhopala froeschneri Henry & Wheeler, 1986
- Melanorhopala infuscat Parshley, 1917
- Melanorhopala infuscata Parshley, 1917
