= Gargaphia albescens =

Scientific classification
- Domain: Eukaryota
- Kingdom: Animalia
- Phylum: Arthropoda
- Class: Insecta
- Order: Hemiptera
- Suborder: Heteroptera
- Family: Tingidae
- Tribe: Tingini
- Genus: Gargaphia
- Species: G. albescens

Binomial name
- Gargaphia albescens Drake, 1917

Species of true bug

Gargaphia albescens is a species of lace bug in the family Tingidae. It is found in North America.
