= Leptodictya simulans =

Scientific classification
- Kingdom: Animalia
- Phylum: Arthropoda
- Clade: Pancrustacea
- Class: Insecta
- Order: Hemiptera
- Suborder: Heteroptera
- Family: Tingidae
- Tribe: Tingini
- Genus: Leptodictya
- Species: L. simulans

Binomial name
- Leptodictya simulans Heidemann, 1913

Species of true bug

Leptodictya simulans is a species of lace bug in the family Tingidae. It is found in North America. Its host plant is bamboo.
