= Leptodictya plana =

Scientific classification
- Domain: Eukaryota
- Kingdom: Animalia
- Phylum: Arthropoda
- Class: Insecta
- Order: Hemiptera
- Suborder: Heteroptera
- Family: Tingidae
- Tribe: Tingini
- Genus: Leptodictya
- Species: L. plana

Binomial name
- Leptodictya plana Heidemann, 1913

Species of true bug

Leptodictya plana is a species of lace bug in the family Tingidae. It is found in Central America and North America.
