= Alveotingis =

Scientific classification
- Kingdom: Animalia
- Phylum: Arthropoda
- Clade: Pancrustacea
- Class: Insecta
- Order: Hemiptera
- Suborder: Heteroptera
- Family: Tingidae
- Subfamily: Tinginae
- Tribe: Tingini
- Genus: Alveotingis; Osborn & Drake, 1916

Genus of true bugs

Alveotingis is a genus of lace bugs in the family Tingidae. There are at least three described species in Alveotingis.

== Species ==
These three species belong to the genus Alveotingis:

- Alveotingis brevicornis Osborn & Drake, 1917
- Alveotingis grossocerata Osborn & Drake, 1916
- Alveotingis minor Osborn & Drake, 1917
