= Haedus (bug) =

Scientific classification
- Domain: Eukaryota
- Kingdom: Animalia
- Phylum: Arthropoda
- Class: Insecta
- Order: Hemiptera
- Suborder: Heteroptera
- Family: Tingidae
- Tribe: Tingini
- Genus: Haedus; Distant, 1904

Genus of true bugs

Haedus is a genus of lace bugs in the family Tingidae. There are at least 30 described species in Haedus.

== Species ==
These 32 species belong to the genus Haedus:

- Haedus agelasticus Göllner-Scheiding, 2003
- Haedus bellus (Drake, 1948)
- Haedus burungus Schouteden, 1953
- Haedus cinghalensis Péricart, 1991
- Haedus cirratus Drake and Hill, 1964
- Haedus clarissimus Duarte Rodrigues, 1981
- Haedus clypeatus Distant, 1904
- Haedus decellei Schouteden, 1957
- Haedus dissimilis Duarte Rodrigues, 1981
- Haedus diversatis (Drake, 1927)
- Haedus elegantissimus Duarte Rodrigues, 1981
- Haedus elongatus (Drake, 1948)
- Haedus foetidus Göllner-Scheiding, 2003
- Haedus grewii Livingstone and Jeyanthibai, 1993
- Haedus javancus Drake, 1953
- Haedus lectus (Drake, 1937)
- Haedus linnavuorii Duarte Rodrigues, 1986
- Haedus longus Duarte Rodrigues, 1981
- Haedus manii Livingstone and Jeyanthibai, 1993
- Haedus nymphias Linnavuori, 1977
- Haedus oios Drake and Ruhoff, 1962
- Haedus otiosus Drake, 1953
- Haedus pallens Schouteden, 1953
- Haedus pictus (Distant, 1910)
- Haedus polulus Drake, 1953
- Haedus ruthii Livingstone and Jeyanthibai, 1993
- Haedus schoutedeni Duarte Rodrigues, 1981
- Haedus sidae (Drake and Poor, 1939)
- Haedus spinosus Duarte Rodrigues, 1990
- Haedus vicarius (Drake, 1927)
- Haedus villiersi (Drake, 1953)
- Haedus yacoobii Livingstone and Jeyanthibai, 1993
