= Calotingis =

Scientific classification
- Kingdom: Animalia
- Phylum: Arthropoda
- Clade: Pancrustacea
- Class: Insecta
- Order: Hemiptera
- Suborder: Heteroptera
- Family: Tingidae
- Subfamily: Tinginae
- Tribe: Tingini
- Genus: Calotingis; Drake, 1918

Genus of true bugs

Calotingis is a genus of lace bugs in the family Tingidae. There are at least two described species in Calotingis.

== Species ==
These two species belong to the genus Calotingis:

- Calotingis knighti Drake, 1918
- Calotingis subopaca (Hacker, 1928)
