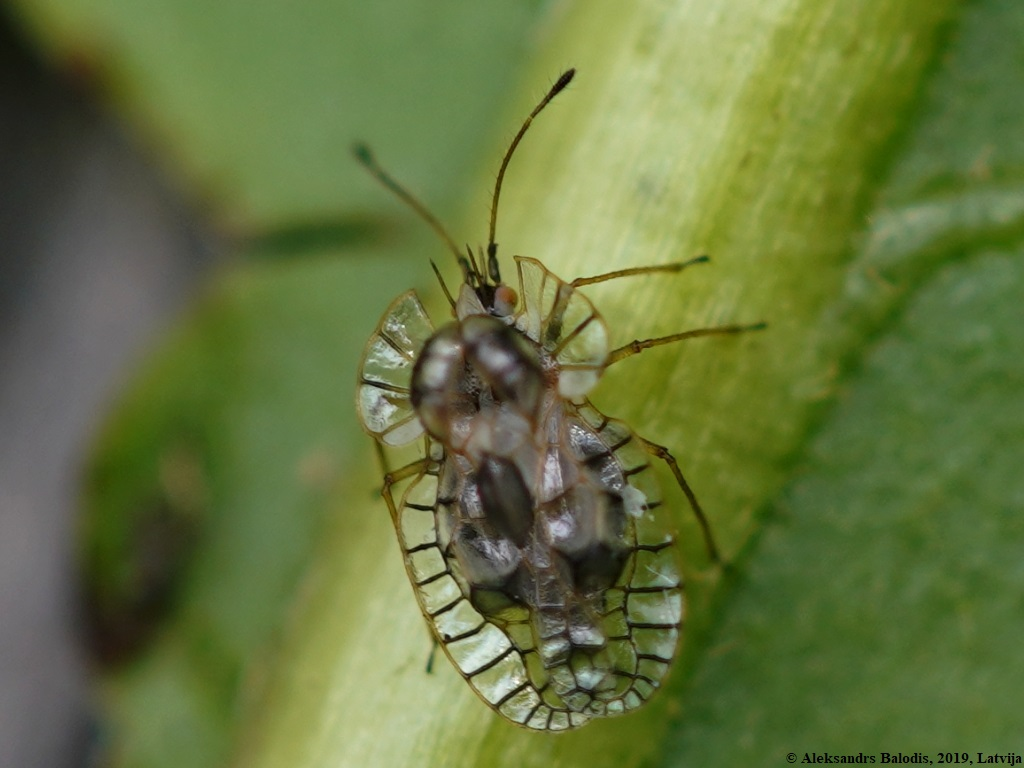

Scientific classification
- Domain: Eukaryota
- Kingdom: Animalia
- Phylum: Arthropoda
- Class: Insecta
- Order: Hemiptera
- Suborder: Heteroptera
- Family: Tingidae
- Genus: Galeatus
- Species: G. affinis

Binomial name
- Galeatus affinis (Herrich-schaeffer, 1835)

Synonyms
- Tingis affinis Herrich-Schaeffer, 1835

= Galeatus affinis =

Species of true bug

Galeatus affinis is a species of lace bug in the family Tingidae. It is found in Europe and Northern Asia (excluding China), North America, and Southern Asia.
