= Ildefonsus (bug) =

Scientific classification
- Kingdom: Animalia
- Phylum: Arthropoda
- Class: Insecta
- Order: Hemiptera
- Suborder: Heteroptera
- Family: Tingidae
- Tribe: Tingini
- Genus: Ildefonsus; Distant, 1910

Genus of true bugs

Ildefonsus is a genus of lace bugs in the family Tingidae. There are about six described species in Ildefonsus.

== Species ==
These six species belong to the genus Ildefonsus:

- Ildefonsus ampliatus Péricart, 1985
- Ildefonsus distanti Li and Zheng, 2006
- Ildefonsus javanus Péricart, 2000
- Ildefonsus nepalensis Tomokuni, 1981
- Ildefonsus nexus Drake and Ruhoff, 1961
- Ildefonsus provorsus Distant, 1910
