= Ypsotingini =

Scientific classification
- Domain: Eukaryota
- Kingdom: Animalia
- Phylum: Arthropoda
- Class: Insecta
- Order: Hemiptera
- Suborder: Heteroptera
- Family: Tingidae
- Subfamily: Tinginae
- Tribe: Ypsotingini; Drake, 1964

Tribe of true bugs

Ypsotingini is a cosmopolitan tribe of lace bugs. Seven genera have been recorded.

== List of genera ==
- Chorotingis Drake
- Derephysia Spinola
- Dictyonota Curtis
- Dictyotingis Drake
- Euaulana Drake
- Kalama Puton
- Ypsotingis Drake
