= Mummius (bug) =

Scientific classification
- Kingdom: Animalia
- Phylum: Arthropoda
- Class: Insecta
- Order: Hemiptera
- Suborder: Heteroptera
- Family: Tingidae
- Tribe: Tingini
- Genus: Mummius; Horváth, 1910

Genus of true bugs

Mummius is a genus of lace bugs in the family Tingidae. There are at least three described species in Mummius.

== Species ==
These three species belong to the genus Mummius:

- Mummius bicorniger Horváth, 1910
- Mummius denigratus Drake, 1954
- Mummius minor Duarte Rodrigues, 1977
