= Eteoneus (bug) =

Scientific classification
- Domain: Eukaryota
- Kingdom: Animalia
- Phylum: Arthropoda
- Class: Insecta
- Order: Hemiptera
- Suborder: Heteroptera
- Family: Tingidae
- Tribe: Tingini
- Genus: Eteoneus; Distant, 1903

Genus of true bugs

Eteoneus is a genus of lace bugs in the family Tingidae, which has at least 20 described species in Eteoneus.

== Species ==
These 23 species belong to the genus Eteoneus:

- Eteoneus angolensis Drake, 1955
- Eteoneus angulatus Drake and Maa, 1953
- Eteoneus assamensis Péricart, 1985
- Eteoneus boops (Blöte, 1945)
- Eteoneus cinchonaensis Livingstone and Jeyanthibai, 1994
- Eteoneus confectus Drake, 1942
- Eteoneus congolensis Schouteden, 1923
- Eteoneus dilatatus (Distant, 1903)
- Eteoneus esakii Drake, 1939
- Eteoneus flavicornis Linnavuori, 1977
- Eteoneus homelys Drake and Ruhoff, 1962
- Eteoneus inopinus Drake, 1945
- Eteoneus lectus Drake, 1960
- Eteoneus megistus Drake and Ruhoff, 1965
- Eteoneus minor Schouteden, 1955
- Eteoneus palauensis Guilbert, 2001
- Eteoneus peroronus Drake, 1942
- Eteoneus samoaensis Guilbert, 2001
- Eteoneus sarptus Drake and Poor, 1937
- Eteoneus sigillatus Drake and Poor, 1936
- Eteoneus virtutis Drake and Poor, 1937
- Eteoneus visendus Drake and Poor, 1937
- Eteoneus yasumatsui Takeya, 1962
