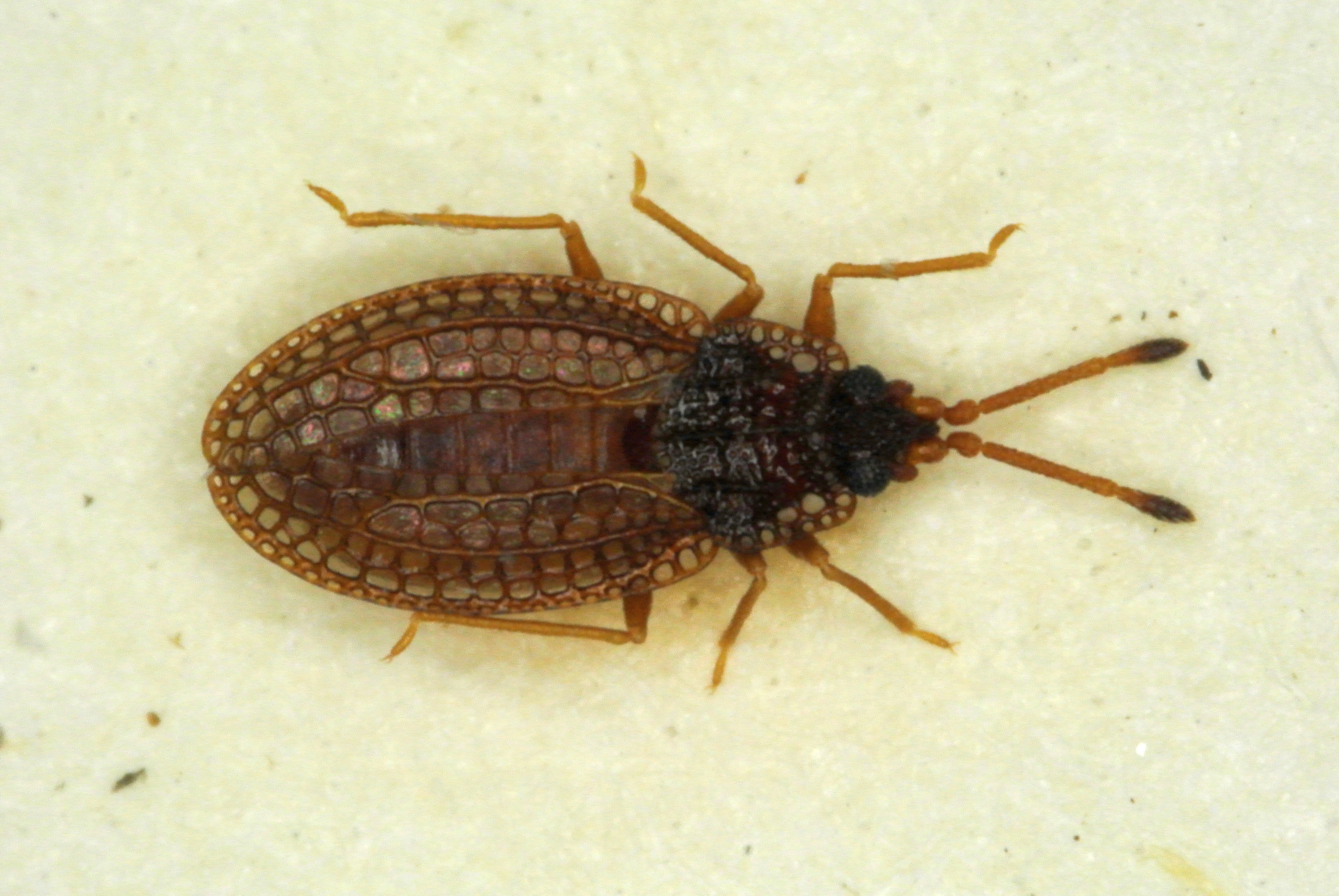
- Campylosteira verna

Scientific classification
- Domain: Eukaryota
- Kingdom: Animalia
- Phylum: Arthropoda
- Class: Insecta
- Order: Hemiptera
- Suborder: Heteroptera
- Family: Tingidae
- Subfamily: Tinginae
- Tribe: Tingini
- Genus: Campylosteira; Fieber, 1844

= Campylosteira =

Genus of true bugs

Campylosteira is a genus of lace bugs in the tribe Tingini. Species are recorded from Asia, Africa, North America and Europe and includes C. verna found in the British Isles.

== Species ==
The Lace Bugs Database lists the following:

1. Campylosteira bosnica Horváth, 1892
2. Campylosteira ciliata Fieber, 1844
3. Campylosteira dispar Horváth, 1905
4. Campylosteira eximia Horváth, 1892
5. Campylosteira falleni Fieber, 1844
6. Campylosteira heissi Péricart, 1981
7. Campylosteira horvathi Drake, 1951
8. Campylosteira jakesi Stusak, 1979
9. Campylosteira libanotica Horváth, 1906
10. Campylosteira moroccana Puton, 1887
11. Campylosteira orientalis Horváth, 1881
12. Campylosteira parvula Ferrari, 1874
13. Campylosteira perithrix Puton, 1887
14. Campylosteira pilicornis Horváth, 1906
15. Campylosteira pilifera Reuter, 1880
16. Campylosteira rotundata Takeya, 1933
17. Campylosteira serena Horváth, 1902
18. Campylosteira sinuata Fieber, 1861
19. Campylosteira sororcula Horváth, 1905
20. Campylosteira verna (Fallén, 1826) - type species (as Tingis verna Fallén)
