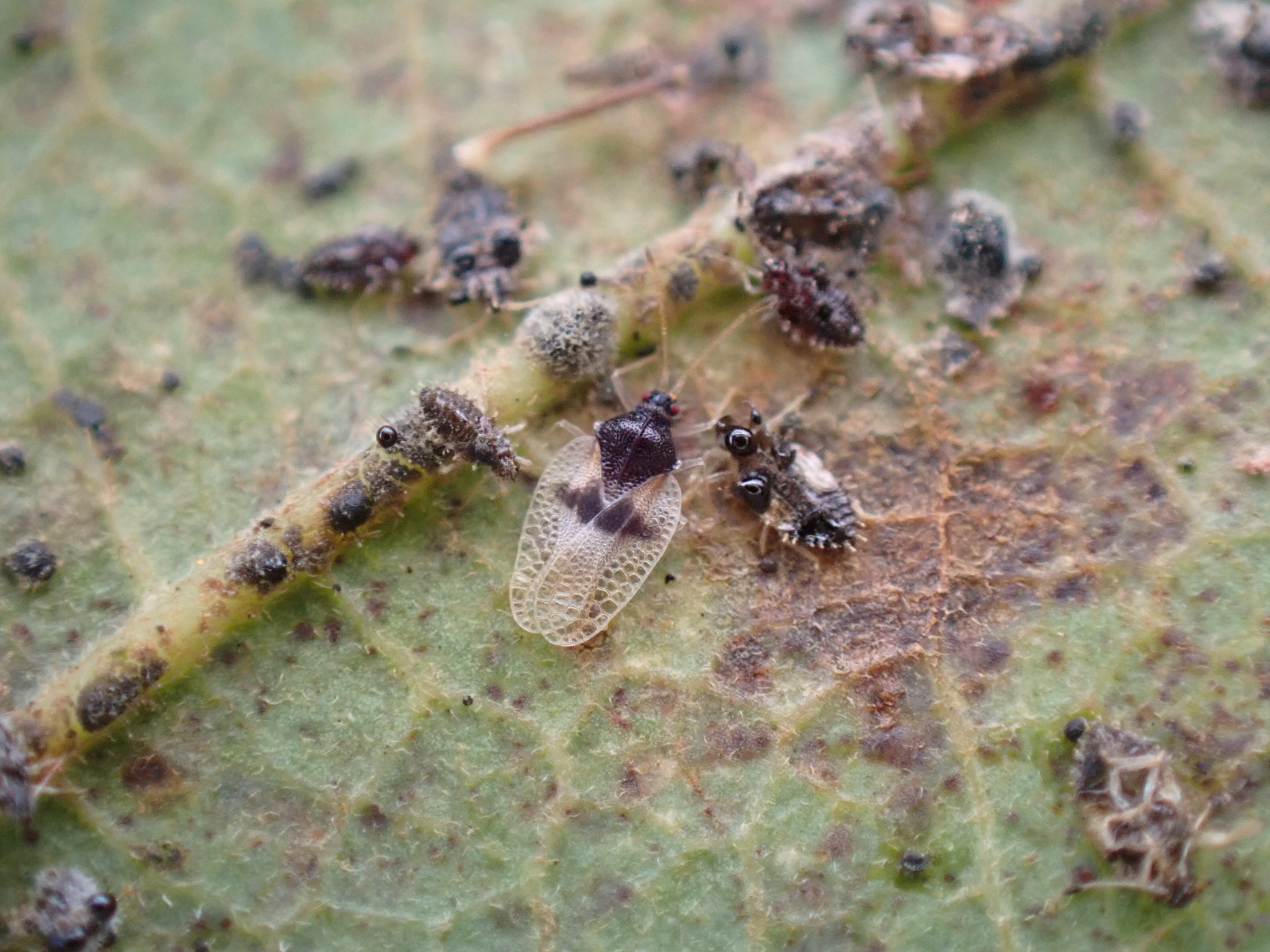

Scientific classification
- Kingdom: Animalia
- Phylum: Arthropoda
- Clade: Pancrustacea
- Class: Insecta
- Order: Hemiptera
- Suborder: Heteroptera
- Family: Tingidae
- Tribe: Tingini
- Genus: Pseudacysta; Blatchley, 1926
- Species: P. perseae

Binomial name
- Pseudacysta perseae (Heidemann, 1908)

= Pseudacysta =

Genus of true bugs

Pseudacysta is a genus of lace bugs in the family Tingidae. There is one described species in Pseudacysta, P. perseae, which is a pest of avocado trees.
