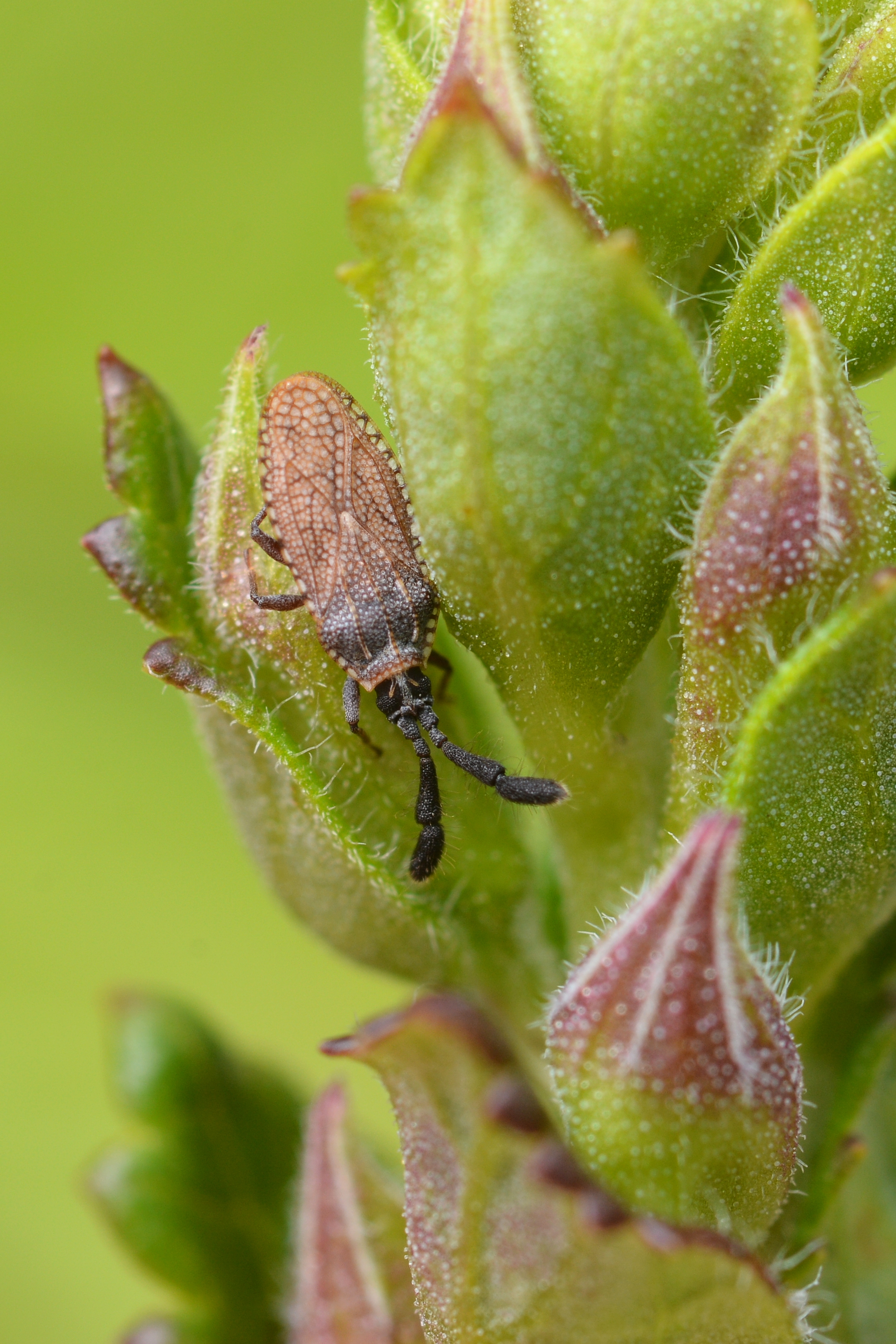
- Copium clavicorne on a wall germander plant

Scientific classification
- Kingdom: Animalia
- Phylum: Arthropoda
- Clade: Pancrustacea
- Class: Insecta
- Order: Hemiptera
- Suborder: Heteroptera
- Family: Tingidae
- Tribe: Tingini
- Genus: Copium; Thunberg, 1822

Synonyms
- Monanthia Lepeletier & Audinet-Serville, 1828; Copius Burmeister, 1835 (Missp.)

= Copium =

Genus of true bugs

Copium is a genus of lace bugs in the family Tingidae.

== Species ==
Twelve species are currently recognized:

- Copium adumbratum (Horváth, 1891)
- Copium bernardi Wagner, 1954
- Copium brevicorne (Jakovlev, 1880)
- Copium clavicorne (Linnaeus, 1758)
- Copium cornutum (Shuruj, 1922)
- Copium horvathi Wagner, 1957
- Copium intermedium (Rey, 1888)
- Copium iranium Wagner, 1969
- Copium japonicum Esaki, 1931
- Copium magnicorne (Rey, 1888)
- Copium reyi Wagner, 1954
- Copium teucrii (Host, 1788)
