= Hesperotingis fuscata =

Scientific classification
- Domain: Eukaryota
- Kingdom: Animalia
- Phylum: Arthropoda
- Class: Insecta
- Order: Hemiptera
- Suborder: Heteroptera
- Family: Tingidae
- Genus: Hesperotingis
- Species: H. fuscata

Binomial name
- Hesperotingis fuscata Parshley, 1917

Species of true bug

Hesperotingis fuscata is a species of lace bug in the family Tingidae. It is found in North America.
