= Aidoneus (bug) =

Scientific classification
- Kingdom: Animalia
- Phylum: Arthropoda
- Clade: Pancrustacea
- Class: Insecta
- Order: Hemiptera
- Suborder: Heteroptera
- Family: Tingidae
- Tribe: Tingini
- Genus: Aidoneus; Distant, 1909

Genus of true bugs

Aidoneus is a genus of lace bugs in the family Tingidae. There is at least one described species in Aidoneus, A. dissimilis.
