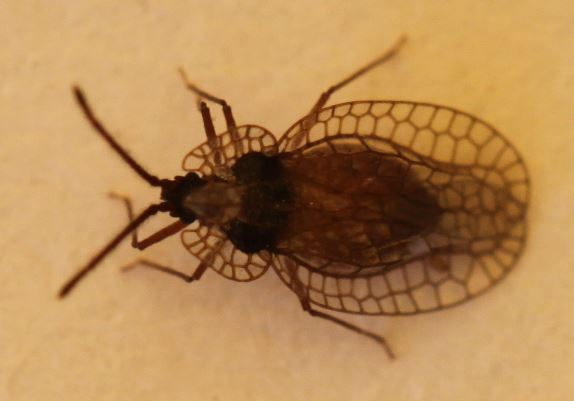

Scientific classification
- Domain: Eukaryota
- Kingdom: Animalia
- Phylum: Arthropoda
- Class: Insecta
- Order: Hemiptera
- Suborder: Heteroptera
- Family: Tingidae
- Genus: Derephysia
- Species: D. foliacea

Binomial name
- Derephysia foliacea (Fallén, 1807)

= Derephysia foliacea =

Species of true bug

Derephysia foliacea, the foliaceous lace bug, is a species of lace bug in the family Tingidae. It is found in Africa, Europe and Northern Asia (excluding China), and Southern Asia.

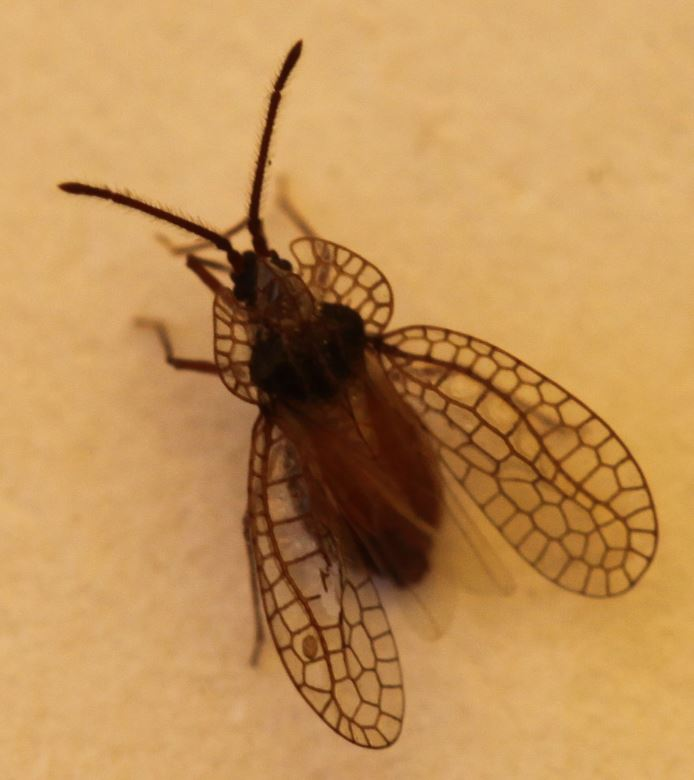
Foliaceous lace bug, Derephysia foliacea

== Subspecies ==
These two subspecies belong to the species Derephysia foliacea:

- Derephysia foliacea biroi Horváth, 1896
- Derephysia foliacea foliacea (Fallén, 1807)
