= Hesperotingis =

Scientific classification
- Domain: Eukaryota
- Kingdom: Animalia
- Phylum: Arthropoda
- Class: Insecta
- Order: Hemiptera
- Suborder: Heteroptera
- Family: Tingidae
- Tribe: Tingini
- Genus: Hesperotingis; Parshley, 1917

Genus of true bugs

Hesperotingis is a genus of lace bugs in the family Tingidae. There are about eight described species in Hesperotingis.

== Species ==
These eight species belong to the genus Hesperotingis:

- Hesperotingis antennata Parshley, 1917
- Hesperotingis duryi (Osborn and Drake, 1916)
- Hesperotingis floridana Drake, 1928
- Hesperotingis fuscata Parshley, 1917
- Hesperotingis illinoiensis Drake, 1918
- Hesperotingis mississipiensis Drake, 1928
- Hesperotingis mississippiensis Drake, 1928
- Hesperotingis occidentalis Drake, 1922
