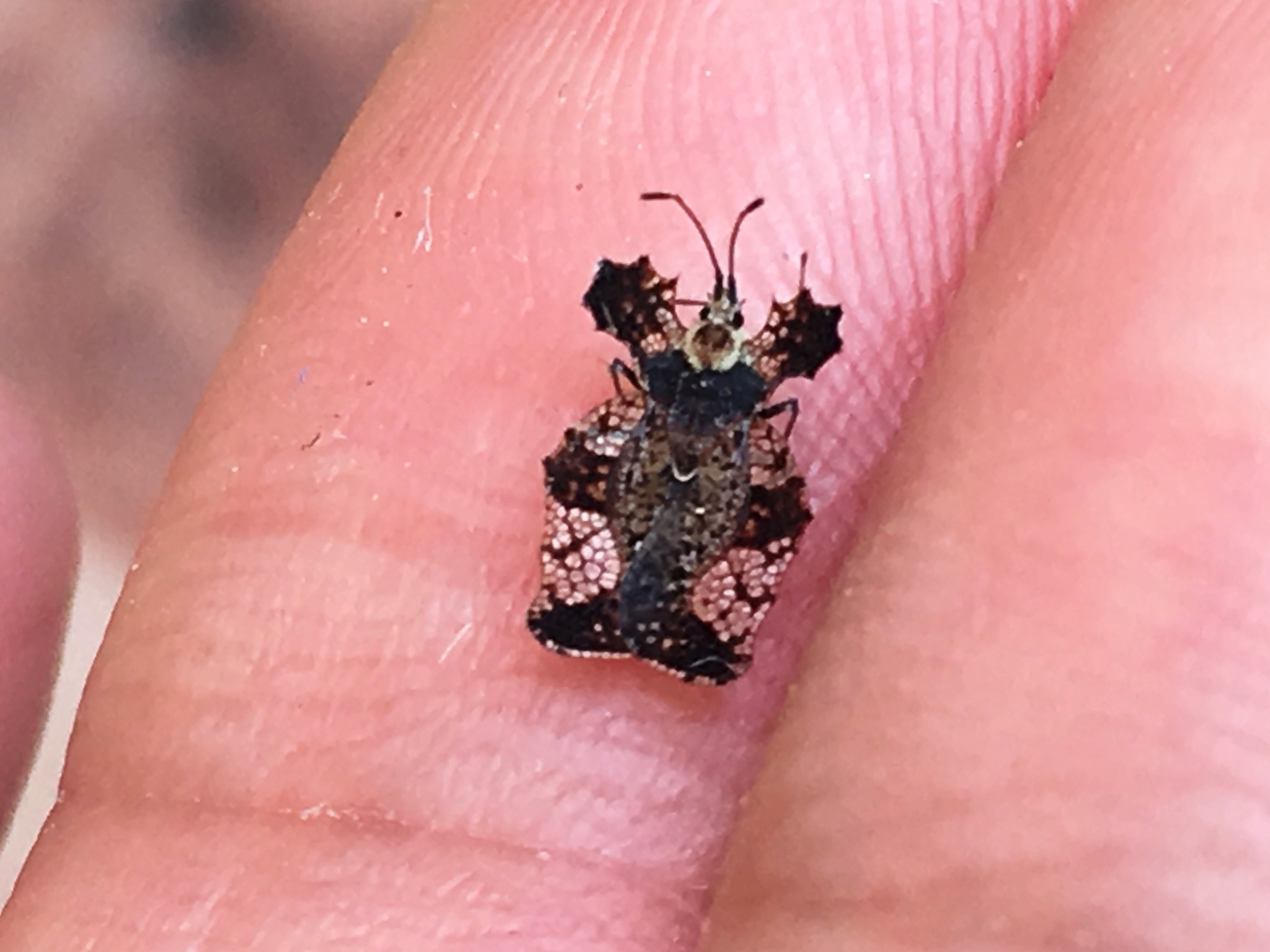
- A. erosus from Cebu, Philippines

Scientific classification
- Domain: Eukaryota
- Kingdom: Animalia
- Phylum: Arthropoda
- Class: Insecta
- Order: Hemiptera
- Suborder: Heteroptera
- Family: Tingidae
- Tribe: Tingini
- Genus: Ammianus; Distant, 1903

= Ammianus (bug) =

Genus of true bugs

Ammianus is a genus of lace bugs in the family Tingidae. There are at least 40 described species in Ammianus.

== Species ==
These 41 species belong to the genus Ammianus:

- Ammianus admirandus (Drake, 1931)
- Ammianus aeneas Linnavuori, 1977
- Ammianus alaticollis (Stål, 1855)
- Ammianus alberti (Schouteden, 1916)
- Ammianus basilewskyi Schouteden, 1957
- Ammianus bobangensis (Schouteden, 1923)
- Ammianus burgeoni (Schouteden, 1923)
- Ammianus corticinus (Horváth, 1911)
- Ammianus depictus (Schouteden, 1923)
- Ammianus dilatatus (Guérin-Méneville, 1831)
- Ammianus distinctus Duarte Rodrigues, 1982
- Ammianus echo Linnavuori, 1977
- Ammianus elisabethae (Schouteden, 1916)
- Ammianus ernsti Deckert and Göllner-Scheiding, 2006
- Ammianus erosus (Fieber, 1844)
- Ammianus flabilis (Bergroth, 1894)
- Ammianus ghesquierei (Schouteden, 1923)
- Ammianus junodi (Distant, 1904)
- Ammianus kassianoffi Drake, 1955
- Ammianus laminatus (Horváth, 1911)
- Ammianus lemuriensis Duarte Rodrigues, 1992
- Ammianus maseruanus (Drake, 1956)
- Ammianus mayri (Haglund, 1895)
- Ammianus montanus Linnavuori, 1977
- Ammianus mussolinii (Mancini, 1939)
- Ammianus natalensis Duarte Rodrigues, 1982
- Ammianus paraspinosus Linnavuori, 1977
- Ammianus perakensis (Distant, 1902)
- Ammianus philippinensis (Distant, 1902)
- Ammianus quadrangulatus Jing, 1980
- Ammianus ravanus (Kirkaldy, 1902)
- Ammianus schoutedeni Distant, 1908
- Ammianus spinosus (Schouteden, 1923)
- Ammianus stuckenbergi Duarte Rodrigues, 1982
- Ammianus tellinii (Schouteden, 1916)
- Ammianus toi (Drake, 1938)
- Ammianus urundicus Schouteden, 1957
- Ammianus usambarensis Duarte Rodrigues, 1982
- Ammianus vanderijsti (Schouteden, 1923)
- Ammianus vicinus Schouteden, 1957
- Ammianus wahlbergi (Stål, 1855)
