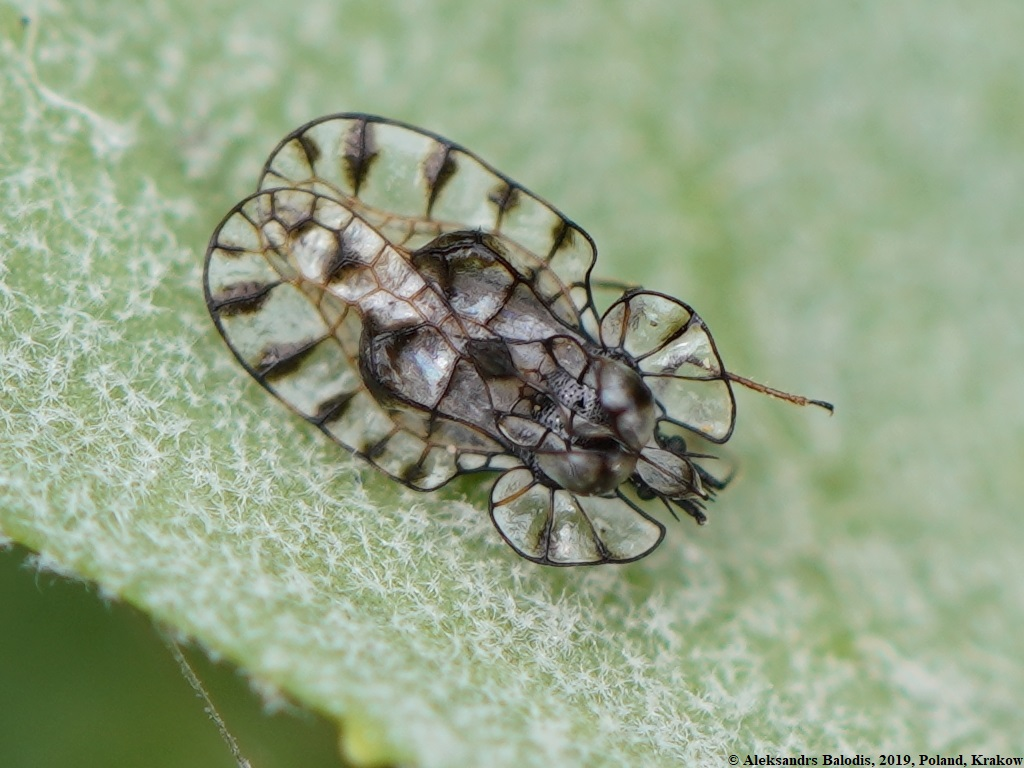
- Galeatus maculatus

Scientific classification
- Kingdom: Animalia
- Phylum: Arthropoda
- Clade: Pancrustacea
- Class: Insecta
- Order: Hemiptera
- Suborder: Heteroptera
- Family: Tingidae
- Tribe: Tingini
- Genus: Galeatus; Curtis, 1833

= Galeatus =

Genus of true bugs

Galeatus is a genus of lace bugs in the family Tingidae. There are about 18 described species in Galeatus.

== Species ==
These 18 species belong to the genus Galeatus:

- Galeatus affinis (Herrich-schaeffer, 1835)
- Galeatus armatus Takeya, 1931
- Galeatus cellularis Jakovlev, 1884
- Galeatus clara Drake, 1948
- Galeatus decorus Jakovlev, 1880
- Galeatus helianthi Önder, 1978
- Galeatus inermis (Jakovlev, 1876)
- Galeatus maculatus (Herrich-Schaeffer, 1838)
- Galeatus major Puton, 1886
- Galeatus pardus Golub, 1974
- Galeatus regius Golub, 1974
- Galeatus schwarzi Drake
- Galeatus scitulus Drake & Maa, 1953
- Galeatus scrophicus Saunders, 1876
- Galeatus sinuatus (Herrich-Schaeffer, 1838)
- Galeatus spinifrons (Fallén, 1807)
- Galeatus trevius Li & Zheng, 2006
- Galeatus vitreus Golub, 1974
