= Physatocheila plexa =

Scientific classification
- Domain: Eukaryota
- Kingdom: Animalia
- Phylum: Arthropoda
- Class: Insecta
- Order: Hemiptera
- Suborder: Heteroptera
- Family: Tingidae
- Genus: Physatocheila
- Species: P. plexa

Binomial name
- Physatocheila plexa (Say, 1832)

Synonyms
- Tingis plexus Say, 1832

Species of true bug

Physatocheila plexa is a species of lace bug in the family Tingidae. It is found in North America.
