= Vatiga =

Scientific classification
- Kingdom: Animalia
- Phylum: Arthropoda
- Clade: Pancrustacea
- Class: Insecta
- Order: Hemiptera
- Suborder: Heteroptera
- Family: Tingidae
- Subfamily: Tinginae
- Tribe: Tingini
- Genus: Vatiga; Drake & Hambleton, 1946

Genus of true bugs

Vatiga is a genus of lace bugs in the family Tingidae. There are about 11 described species in Vatiga.

== Species ==
These 11 species belong to the genus Vatiga:

- Vatiga cassiae (Drake & Hambleton, 1934)
- Vatiga celebrata (Drake, 1928)
- Vatiga illudens (Drake, 1922) (cassava lace bug)
- Vatiga lonchocarpa (Drake & Hambleton, 1944)
- Vatiga longula (Drake, 1922)
- Vatiga manihotae (Drake, 1922)
- Vatiga pauxilla (Drake & Poor, 1939)
- Vatiga sesoris (Drake & Hambleton, 1942)
- Vatiga variana Drake & Hambleton, 1946
- Vatiga varianta (Drake, 1930)
- Vatiga viscosana Drake & Hambleton, 1946
