= Acanthocheila =

Scientific classification
- Kingdom: Animalia
- Phylum: Arthropoda
- Clade: Pancrustacea
- Class: Insecta
- Order: Hemiptera
- Suborder: Heteroptera
- Family: Tingidae
- Subfamily: Tinginae
- Tribe: Tingini
- Genus: Acanthocheila; Stål, 1858

Genus of true bugs

Acanthocheila is a genus of lace bugs in the family Tingidae. There are about 17 described species in Acanthocheila.

== Species ==
These 17 species belong to the genus Acanthocheila:

- Acanthocheila abducta Buchanan-White, 1879
- Acanthocheila apicicornis Monte, 1940
- Acanthocheila armigera (Stal, 1858)
- Acanthocheila comentis Drake, 1953
- Acanthocheila comitis Drake, 1948
- Acanthocheila denieri Monte, 1940
- Acanthocheila dira Drake & Hambleton, 1945
- Acanthocheila exquisita Uhler, 1889
- Acanthocheila hollandi Drake, 1935
- Acanthocheila nexa Drake, 1936
- Acanthocheila nigriscens Drake & Bondar, 1932
- Acanthocheila rustica Monte, 1942
- Acanthocheila sigillata Drake & Bruner, 1924
- Acanthocheila spinicosta Van Duzee, 1907
- Acanthocheila thaumana Drake & Cobben, 1960
- Acanthocheila tumida Drake, 1924
- Acanthocheila visenda Drake & Hambleton, 1934
