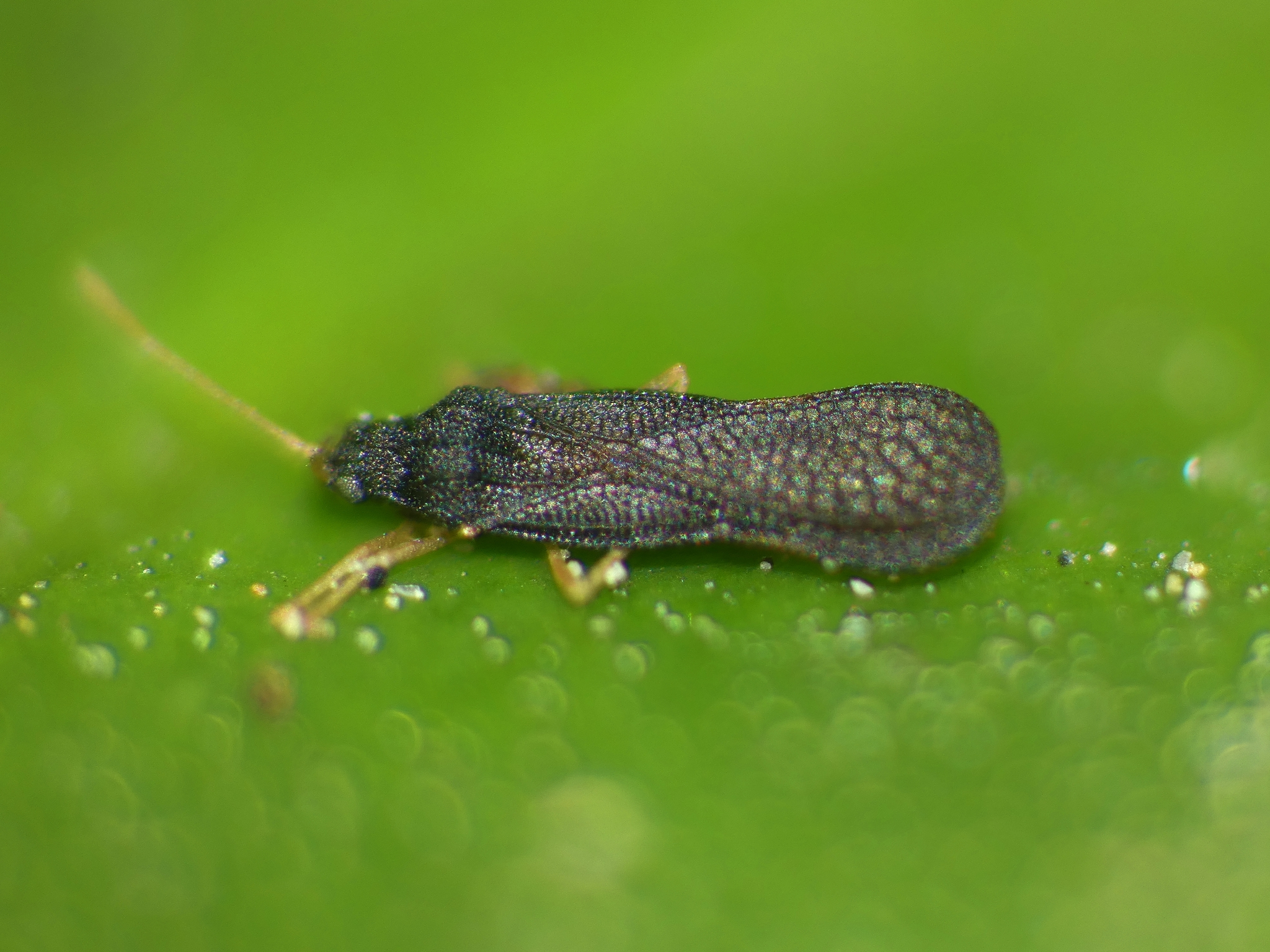
- Larotingis aporia

Scientific classification
- Kingdom: Animalia
- Phylum: Arthropoda
- Clade: Pancrustacea
- Class: Insecta
- Order: Hemiptera
- Suborder: Heteroptera
- Family: Tingidae
- Subfamily: Tinginae
- Tribe: Litadeini; Drake and Ruhoff, 1965

= Litadeini =

Tribe of true bugs

Litadeini /ləteɪdini/ is a pan-tropical tribe of lace bugs. Thirteen genera have been recorded.

== Physical traits ==
This tribe is unique among Tingidae in having the second tarsal segment wider than the first.

== List of genera ==
- Aeopelys Drake & Ruhoff, 1965
- Aristobyrsa Drake & Poor, 1937
- Cephalidiosus Guilbert, 1999
- Cottothucha Drake & Poor, 1941
- Holophygdon Kirkaldy, 1908
- Larotingis Drake, 1960
- Litadea China, 1924
- Oecharis Drake & Ruhoff, 1965
- Ogygotingis Drake, 1948
- Palauella Drake, 1956
- Psilobyrsa Drake & Hambleton, 1935
- Stragulotingis Froeschner, 1969
- Tadelia Linnavuori, 1977
