= Diconocoris =

Scientific classification
- Domain: Eukaryota
- Kingdom: Animalia
- Phylum: Arthropoda
- Class: Insecta
- Order: Hemiptera
- Suborder: Heteroptera
- Family: Tingidae
- Subfamily: Tinginae
- Tribe: Tingini
- Genus: Diconocoris; Mayr, 1865

Genus of true bugs

Diconocoris is a genus of Asian lace bugs in the tribe Tingini.

== Distribution and economic status ==
Diconocoris has been recorded from the Indian subcontinent through to Malesia. In Vietnam, D. hewetti and D. distanti may be called bọ xít lưới, rầy chữ T or rầy thánh giá (can be translated as 'T'- or cross-bugs) and are considered a pest of black pepper.

== Species ==
BioLib lists:

1. Diconocoris capusi (Horváth, 1906)
2. Diconocoris distanti Drake, 1954
3. Diconocoris greeni (Kirby, 1891)
4. Diconocoris hewetti (Distant, 1908)
5. Diconocoris inusitatus (Drake, 1927)
6. Diconocoris javanus Mayr, 1865 - type species
7. Diconocoris nepalensis (Distant, 1909)
