= Lullius (bug) =

Scientific classification
- Kingdom: Animalia
- Phylum: Arthropoda
- Class: Insecta
- Order: Hemiptera
- Suborder: Heteroptera
- Family: Tingidae
- Tribe: Tingini
- Genus: Lullius; Distant, 1904

Genus of true bugs

Lullius is a genus of lace bugs in the family Tingidae. There are about eight described species in Lullius.

== Species ==
These eight species belong to the genus Lullius:

- Lullius affinis Duarte Rodrigues, 1989
- Lullius biseriatus Duarte Rodrigues, 1985
- Lullius insolens Drake, 1944
- Lullius major Distant, 1904
- Lullius minor Distant, 1904
- Lullius parvus Duarte Rodrigues, 1990
- Lullius spinifemur Drake, 1961
- Lullius turneri Duarte Rodrigues, 1982
