= Oncochila =

Scientific classification
- Kingdom: Animalia
- Phylum: Arthropoda
- Clade: Pancrustacea
- Class: Insecta
- Order: Hemiptera
- Suborder: Heteroptera
- Family: Tingidae
- Subfamily: Tinginae
- Tribe: Tingini
- Genus: Oncochila; Stål, 1873

Genus of true bugs

Oncochila is a genus of lace bugs in the tribe Tingini. Species are recorded from temperate Asia and Europe and includes O. simplex found in the British Isles.

== Species ==
BioLib lists the following:

1. Oncochila loginovae Golub, 1982
2. Oncochila scapularis (Fieber, 1844)
  type species (as Monanthia (Physatocheila) scapularis Fieber)
3. Oncochila simplex (Herrich-Schäffer, 1830)

Fossil taxa

- †Oncochila wollastoni (Heer)
