= Abdastartus (bug) =

Scientific classification
- Kingdom: Animalia
- Phylum: Arthropoda
- Clade: Pancrustacea
- Class: Insecta
- Order: Hemiptera
- Suborder: Heteroptera
- Family: Tingidae
- Tribe: Tingini
- Genus: Abdastartus; Distant, 1910

Genus of true bugs

Abdastartus is a genus of lace bugs in the family Tingidae. There are about five described species in Abdastartus.

== Species ==
These five species belong to the genus Abdastartus:

- Abdastartus atrus (Motschulsky, 1863)
- Abdastartus longulus Drake, 1953
- Abdastartus muiri Drake, 1927
- Abdastartus sacchari Drake, 1930
- Abdastartus smetanai Péricart, 1992
