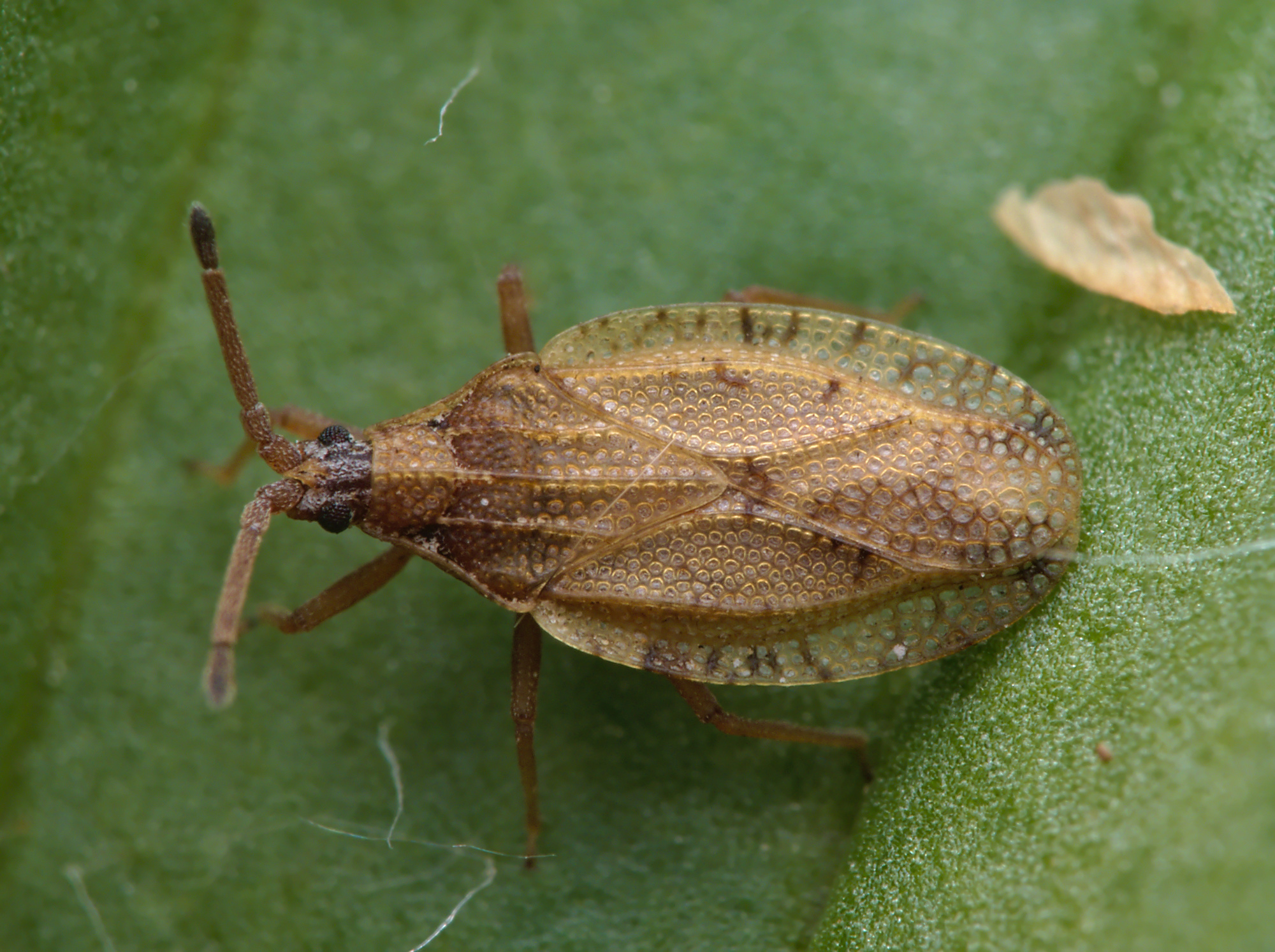

Scientific classification
- Domain: Eukaryota
- Kingdom: Animalia
- Phylum: Arthropoda
- Class: Insecta
- Order: Hemiptera
- Suborder: Heteroptera
- Family: Tingidae
- Tribe: Tingini
- Genus: Catoplatus; Spinola, 1837

= Catoplatus =

Genus of true bugs

Catoplatus is a genus of true bugs belonging to the family Tingidae.

The genus was first described by Spinola in 1837.

Species include:

- Catoplatus disparis Drake & Maa, 1954
- Catoplatus distinctus Montandon, 1895
- Catoplatus fabricii (Stål, 1868)
