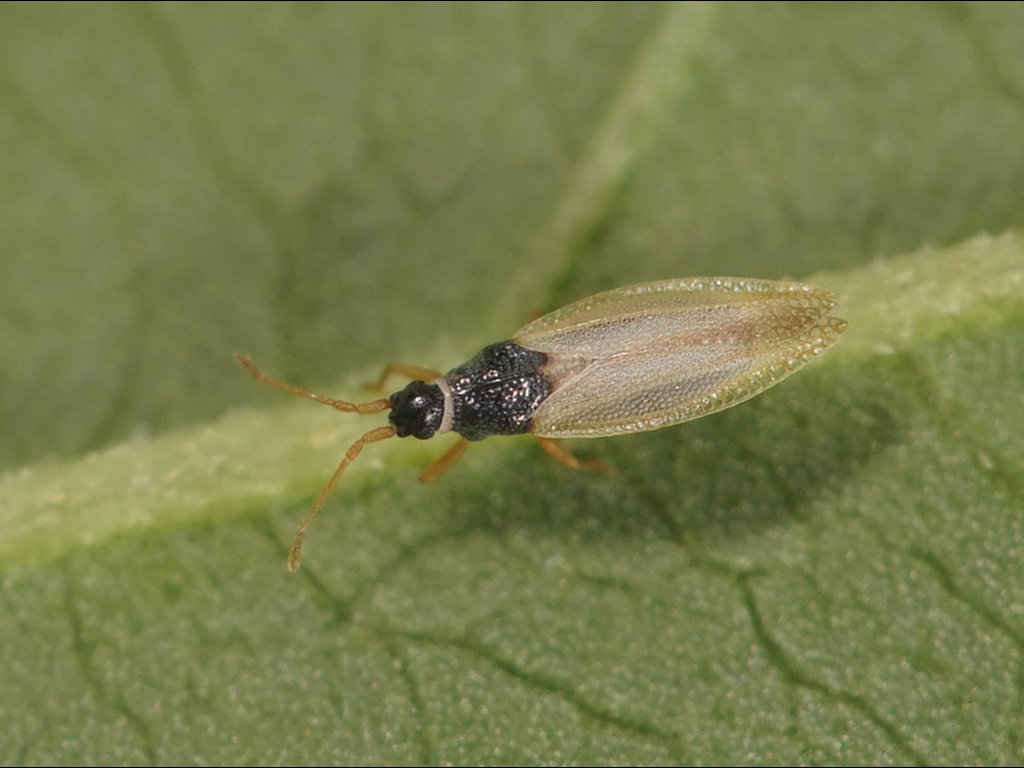

Scientific classification
- Kingdom: Animalia
- Phylum: Arthropoda
- Class: Insecta
- Order: Hemiptera
- Suborder: Heteroptera
- Family: Tingidae
- Tribe: Tingini
- Genus: Agramma; Stephens, 1829

Extant species
- See text

= Agramma =

Genus of insects

Agramma is a genus of insects belonging to the family Tingidae.

The genus was described in 1829 by James Francis Stephens.

The genus has cosmopolitan distribution.

Species:

- Agramma ecmeles Drake & Ruhoff, 1962
- Agramma femorale
- Agramma laeta (Faller)
- Agramma pictipenne (Horváth, 1902)
- Agramma tropidopterum
- Agramma vulturnum
