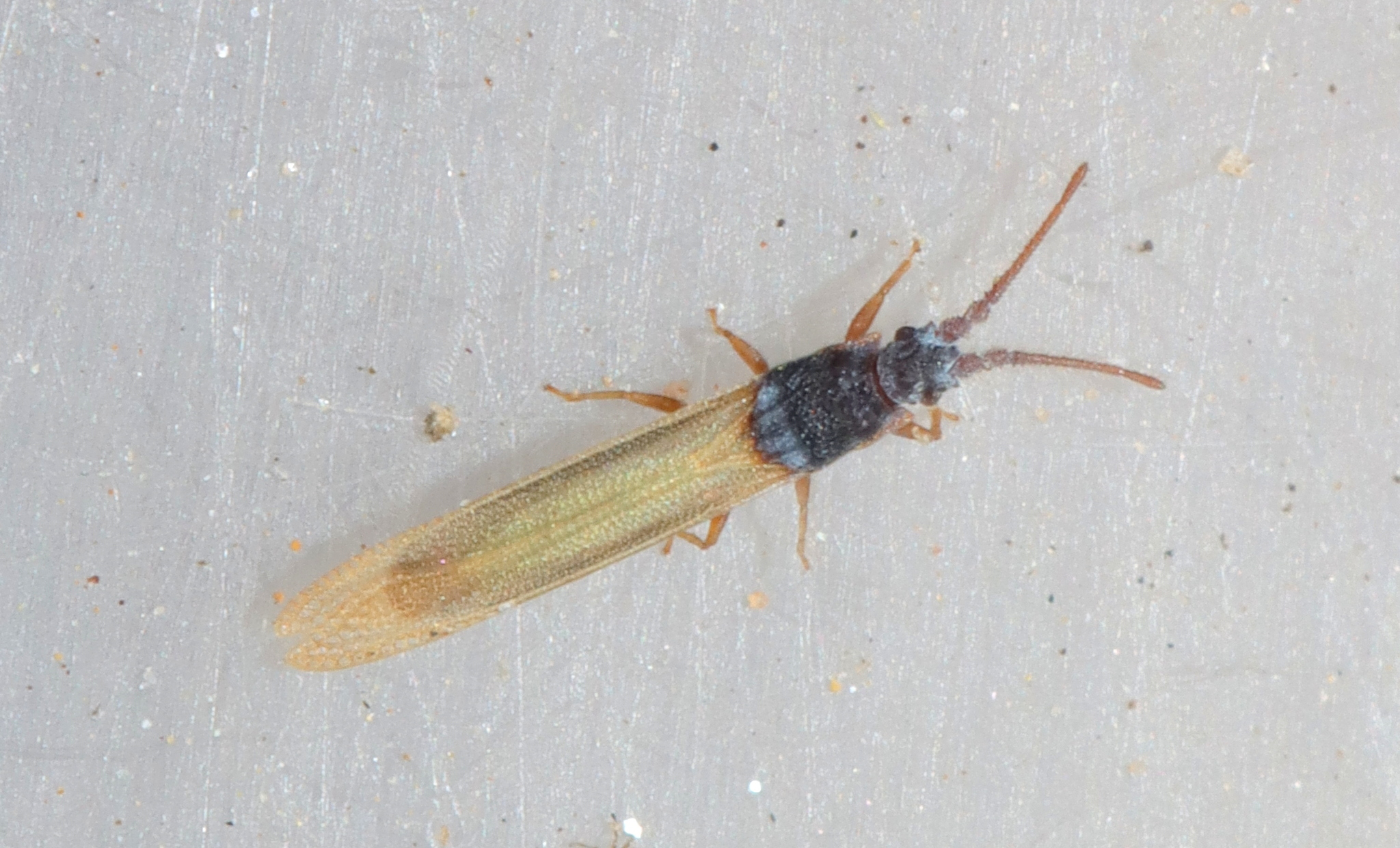
- Mafa lanceolata

Scientific classification
- Kingdom: Animalia
- Phylum: Arthropoda
- Class: Insecta
- Order: Hemiptera
- Suborder: Heteroptera
- Family: Tingidae
- Tribe: Tingini
- Genus: Mafa; Hesse, 1925

= Mafa (bug) =

Genus of true bugs

Mafa is a genus of lace bugs in the family Tingidae. There are about five described species in the genus Mafa.

== Species ==
There are five species recognised in the genus Mafa:

- Mafa lanceolata Hesse, 1925
- Mafa longa Duarte Rodrigues, 1982
- Mafa tenuicostata Duarte Rodrigues, 1982
- Mafa testacea Duarte Rodrigues, 1977
- Mafa theroni Duarte Rodrigues, 1990
