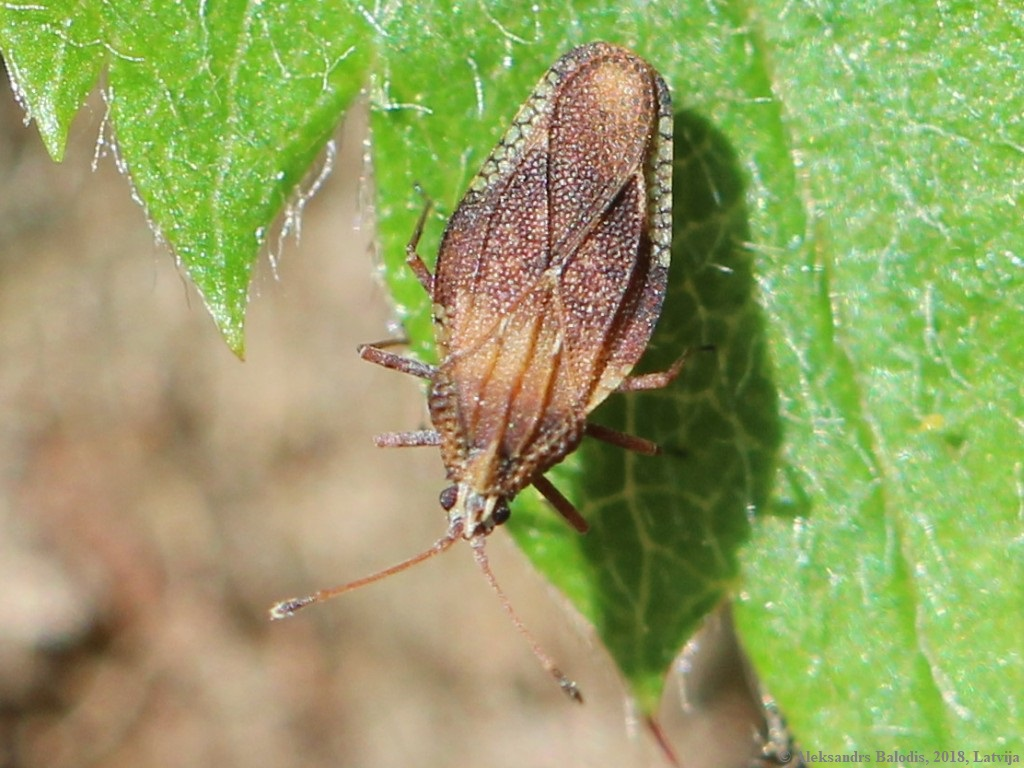
- Physatocheila smreczynskii

Scientific classification
- Kingdom: Animalia
- Phylum: Arthropoda
- Class: Insecta
- Order: Hemiptera
- Suborder: Heteroptera
- Family: Tingidae
- Tribe: Tingini
- Genus: Physatocheila; Fieber, 1844

= Physatocheila =

Genus of true bugs

Physatocheila is a genus of lace bugs in the family Tingidae. There are at least 50 described species in Physatocheila.

== Species ==
- Physatocheila aeuthes Drake and Ruhoff, 1965
- Physatocheila aglaia Drake and Ruhoff, 1961
- Physatocheila alphitoniae Guilbert, 2002
- Physatocheila arbicola Drake, 1958
- Physatocheila asiatica Livingstone and Jeyanthibai, 1994
- Physatocheila bhutanensis Péricart, 1985
- Physatocheila biseriata Hacker, 1929
- Physatocheila brailovskyi Péricart, 1992
- Physatocheila brevirostris Osborn & Drake, 1916
- Physatocheila brunneinervis Péricart, 1992
- Physatocheila chatterjeei Drake and Poor, 1936
- Physatocheila civatis Drake, 1942
- Physatocheila confinis Horváth, 1905
- Physatocheila costata (Fabricius, 1794)
- Physatocheila delicatula Horváth, 1903
- Physatocheila dissimilis Guilbert, 1997
- Physatocheila distinguenda (Jakovlev, 1880)
- Physatocheila dryadis Drake and Poor, 1936
- Physatocheila dumetorum (Herrich-Schaeffer, 1838)
- Physatocheila empheres Drake and Ruhoff, 1965
- Physatocheila enalla Drake and Ruhoff, 1961
- Physatocheila enodis Drake, 1948
- Physatocheila exolasca Drake, 1954
- Physatocheila fasciata (Fieber, 1844)
- Physatocheila ferruginea Bergroth, 1912
- Physatocheila forsteri Putshkov, 1969
- Physatocheila gibba (Fieber, 1844)
- Physatocheila gibbelytra Péricart, 1992
- Physatocheila hailarensis Nonnaizab, 1985
- Physatocheila harwoodi China, 1936
- Physatocheila lautana Drake and Ruhoff, 1961
- Physatocheila lenis Drake and Poor, 1939
- Physatocheila major Osborn and Drake, 1917
- Physatocheila marginata (Distant, 1909)
- Physatocheila marginulata Golub, 1976
- Physatocheila miyatakei Miyamoto, 1964
- Physatocheila montana Duarte Rodrigues, 1992
- Physatocheila municeps Horváth, 1903
- Physatocheila namibiana Duarte Rodrigues, 1982
- Physatocheila objicis Drake, 1942
- Physatocheila obsoleta Péricart, 1984
- Physatocheila orientis Drake, 1942
- Physatocheila plexa (Say, 1832)
- Physatocheila pulchella Lindberg, 1932
- Physatocheila putshkovi Golub, 1976
- Physatocheila ruris Drake, 1942
- Physatocheila scotti Drake, 1954
- Physatocheila similis Péricart, 1985
- Physatocheila smreczynskii China, 1952
- Physatocheila subgibbosa Péricart, 1985
- Physatocheila suttoni Drake, 1947
- Physatocheila thomasi Drake, 1956
- Physatocheila uniseriata Hacker, 1929
- Physatocheila variegata Parshley, 1916
- Physatocheila veteris Drake, 1942
