= Bako (bug) =

Scientific classification
- Kingdom: Animalia
- Phylum: Arthropoda
- Class: Insecta
- Order: Hemiptera
- Suborder: Heteroptera
- Family: Tingidae
- Tribe: Tingini
- Genus: Bako; Schouteden, 1923

Genus of true bugs

Bako is a genus of lace bugs in the family Tingidae. There are about nine described species in Bako.

== Species ==
- Bako arabianus Rodrigues, 1987
- Bako capeneri Drake, 1956
- Bako dieides Drake & Ruhoff, 1961
- Bako distinctus Rodrigues, 1981
- Bako editus Drake, 1956
- Bako lebruni Schouteden, 1923
- Bako lepidus Rodrigues, 1981
- Bako linnavuorii Rodrigues, 1977
- Bako malayanus (Drake, 1947)
