= Belenus (bug) =

Scientific classification
- Kingdom: Animalia
- Phylum: Arthropoda
- Clade: Pancrustacea
- Class: Insecta
- Order: Hemiptera
- Suborder: Heteroptera
- Family: Tingidae
- Tribe: Tingini
- Genus: Belenus; Distant, 1909

Genus of true bugs

Belenus is a genus of African lace bugs in the family Tingidae. There are about nine described species in Belenus.

== Species ==
These nine species belong to the genus Belenus:

- Belenus adocetus Drake, 1957
- Belenus angulatus Distant, 1909
- Belenus bengalensis Distant, 1909
- Belenus davidii Livingstone, 1972
- Belenus dentatus (Fieber, 1844)
- Belenus eupetes Drake and Ruhoff, 1965
- Belenus laplumei (Schouteden, 1916)
- Belenus parvicollis Linnavuori, 1977
- Belenus thomasi Drake, 1957
