= Parada (bug) =

Scientific classification
- Domain: Eukaryota
- Kingdom: Animalia
- Phylum: Arthropoda
- Class: Insecta
- Order: Hemiptera
- Suborder: Heteroptera
- Family: Tingidae
- Tribe: Tingini
- Genus: Parada; Horváth, 1925

Genus of true bugs

Parada is a genus of lace bugs in the family Tingidae. There are about seven described species in Parada.

== Species ==
- Parada absona Drake, 1952
- Parada darlingtoni Drake, 1952
- Parada hackeri Drake, 1952
- Parada popla Drake, 1942
- Parada solla Drake & Ruhoff, 1961
- Parada taeniophora (Horváth, 1925)
- Parada torta Drake, 1942
