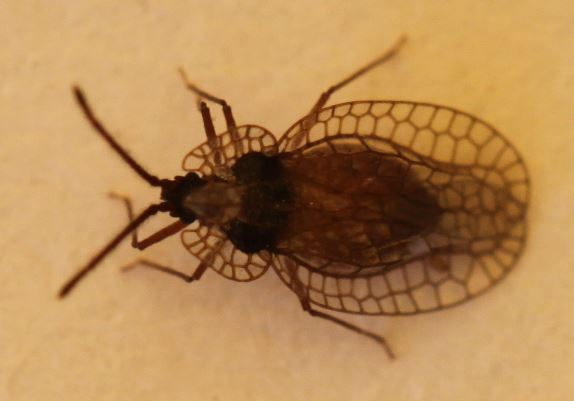
- Derephysia foliacea

Scientific classification
- Kingdom: Animalia
- Phylum: Arthropoda
- Clade: Pancrustacea
- Class: Insecta
- Order: Hemiptera
- Suborder: Heteroptera
- Family: Tingidae
- Subfamily: Tinginae
- Tribe: Ypsotingini
- Genus: Derephysia; Spinola, 1837

Subgenera
- Derephysia (Derephysia) Spinola, 1837; Derephysia (Paraderephysia) Péricart, 1978

= Derephysia =

Genus of true bugs

Derephysia is a genus of lace bugs in the family Tingidae. There are more than 20 described species in Derephysia.

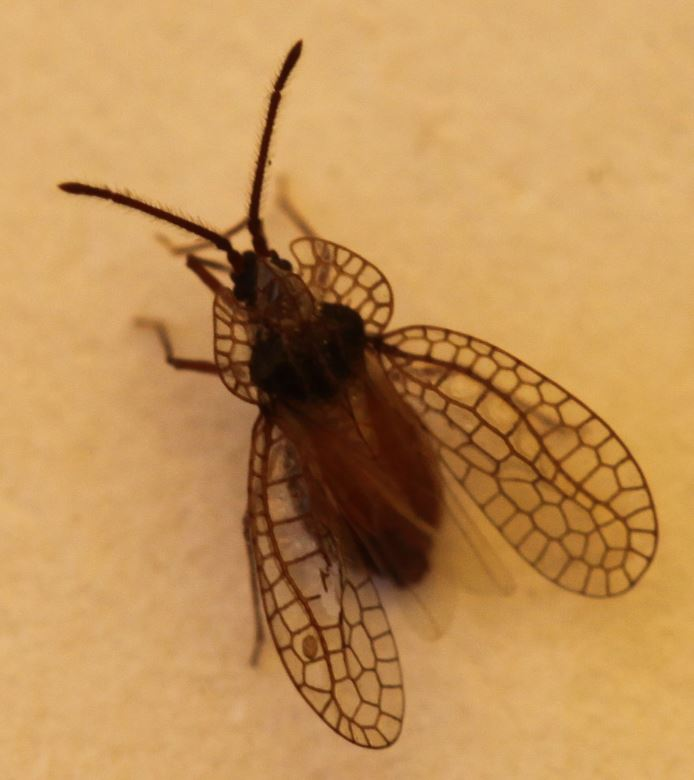
Derephysia foliacea

== Species ==
These 23 species belong to the genus Derephysia:

- Derephysia brevicornis Reuter, 1888
- Derephysia bucharensis Josifov, 1969
- Derephysia cristata (Panzer, 1806)
- Derephysia emmanueli Ribes, 1967
- Derephysia foliacea (Fallen, 1807) (foliaceous lace bug)
- Derephysia fujisana Takeya, 1962
- Derephysia gardneri Drake & Poor, 1936
- Derephysia garneri Drake & Poor, 1936
- Derephysia gracilicornis Josifov, 1969
- Derephysia josefa Baena & Torres, 2009
- Derephysia kiritshenkoi Josifov, 1970
- Derephysia longirostrata Jing, 1980
- Derephysia longispina Golub, 1974
- Derephysia lugens Horváth, 1902
- Derephysia minuta Josifov, 1969
- Derephysia nigricosta Horvath, 1905
- Derephysia ovata Takeya, 1962
- Derephysia penalveri Golub & Popov, 2000
- Derephysia rectinervis Puton, 1887
- Derephysia sinuaticollis Puton, 1879
- Derephysia sinuatocollis Puton, 1879
- Derephysia tibetensia Jing, 1981
- Derephysia tyche Wappler, 2004
