= Atheas (bug) =

Scientific classification
- Kingdom: Animalia
- Phylum: Arthropoda
- Clade: Pancrustacea
- Class: Insecta
- Order: Hemiptera
- Suborder: Heteroptera
- Family: Tingidae
- Tribe: Tingini
- Genus: Atheas; Champion, 1898

Genus of true bugs

Atheas is a genus of lace bugs in the family Tingidae. There are about 15 described species in Atheas.

== Species ==
These 15 species belong to the genus Atheas:

- Atheas austroriparius Heidemann, 1909^{i c g}
- Atheas birabeni^{g}
- Atheas cearanus Monte, 1947^{i c g}
- Atheas exiguus Heidemann, 1909^{i c g}
- Atheas flavipes Champion, 1898^{i c g}
- Atheas fuscipes Champion, 1898^{i c g}
- Atheas insignis Heidemann, 1909^{i c g}
- Atheas laetantis Drake and Hambleton, 1944^{i c g}
- Atheas mimeticus Heidemann, 1909^{i c g b}
- Atheas mirabilis Drake, 1938^{i c g}
- Atheas nigricornis Champion, 1898^{i c g}
- Atheas ornatipes Drake and Hambleton, 1935^{i c g}
- Atheas paganus Drake, 1942^{i c g}
- Atheas placentis Drake and Poor, 1940^{i c g}
- Atheas tristis Van Duzee, 1923^{i c g}

Data sources: i = ITIS, c = Catalogue of Life, g = GBIF, b = Bugguide.net
