= Bunia (bug) =

Scientific classification
- Kingdom: Animalia
- Phylum: Arthropoda
- Class: Insecta
- Order: Hemiptera
- Suborder: Heteroptera
- Family: Tingidae
- Tribe: Tingini
- Genus: Bunia; Schouteden, 1955

Genus of true bugs

Bunia is a genus of lace bugs in the family Tingidae. There are about six described species in Bunia.

== Species ==
These six species belong to the genus Bunia:

- Bunia halleriae (Duarte Rodrigues, 1982)
- Bunia ituriensis Schouteden, 1955
- Bunia malagasy Duarte Rodrigues, 1992
- Bunia milleri (Drake, 1954)
- Bunia pugnana (Drake, 1954)
- Bunia ralla (Drake, 1963)
