= Sinuessa (bug) =

Scientific classification
- Domain: Eukaryota
- Kingdom: Animalia
- Phylum: Arthropoda
- Class: Insecta
- Order: Hemiptera
- Suborder: Heteroptera
- Family: Tingidae
- Tribe: Tingini
- Genus: Sinuessa; Horváth, 1910

Genus of true bugs

Sinuessa is a genus of lace bugs in the family Tingidae. There are about eight described species in Sinuessa.

== Species ==
These eight species belong to the genus Sinuessa:

- Sinuessa colens (Drake, 1953)
- Sinuessa colentis (Drake, 1953)
- Sinuessa deianira Linnavuori, 1977
- Sinuessa minor (Duarte Rodrigues, 1977)
- Sinuessa nairobia Drake, 1957
- Sinuessa parva Stusák, 1984
- Sinuessa subinermis (Horváth, 1910)
- Sinuessa waelbroecki (Schouteden in Bergroth and Schouteden, 1905)
