= Tigava (bug) =

Scientific classification
- Kingdom: Animalia
- Phylum: Arthropoda
- Clade: Pancrustacea
- Class: Insecta
- Order: Hemiptera
- Suborder: Heteroptera
- Family: Tingidae
- Tribe: Tingini
- Genus: Tigava; Stål, 1858

Genus of true bugs

Tigava is a genus of lace bugs in the family Tingidae. There are about 15 described species in Tigava.

== Species ==
These 15 species belong to the genus Tigava:

- Tigava bombacis Drake and Poor, 1938
- Tigava brevicollis Monte, 1944
- Tigava ceibae Drake and Poor, 1938
- Tigava convexicollis Champion, 1897
- Tigava corumbiana Drake, 1942
- Tigava ferruginea Monte, 1940
- Tigava gracilis Monte, 1940
- Tigava graminis Drake and Poor, 1938
- Tigava hambletoni Drake, 1948
- Tigava notabilis Drake, 1922
- Tigava praecellens Stål, 1858
- Tigava pulchella Champion, 1897
- Tigava semota Drake, 1931
- Tigava spatula Monte, 1945
- Tigava tingoana Drake, 1948
