= Pontanus (bug) =

Scientific classification
- Domain: Eukaryota
- Kingdom: Animalia
- Phylum: Arthropoda
- Class: Insecta
- Order: Hemiptera
- Suborder: Heteroptera
- Family: Tingidae
- Genus: Pontanus; Distant, 1902

Genus of true bugs

Pontanus is a genus of lace bugs in the family Tingidae. There are at least four described species in Pontanus.

== Species ==
- Pontanus accedens (Drake, 1947)
- Pontanus cafer (Distant, 1902)
- Pontanus gibbiferus (Walker, 1873)
- Pontanus puerilis (Drake & Poor, 1936)
