= Aeopelys =

Scientific classification
- Kingdom: Animalia
- Phylum: Arthropoda
- Class: Insecta
- Order: Hemiptera
- Suborder: Heteroptera
- Family: Tingidae
- Tribe: Litadeini
- Genus: Aeopelys; Drake and Ruhoff, 1965

Genus of true bugs

Aeopelys is a monotypic genus of lace bugs, found in New Guinea. The sole species is A. neata.
