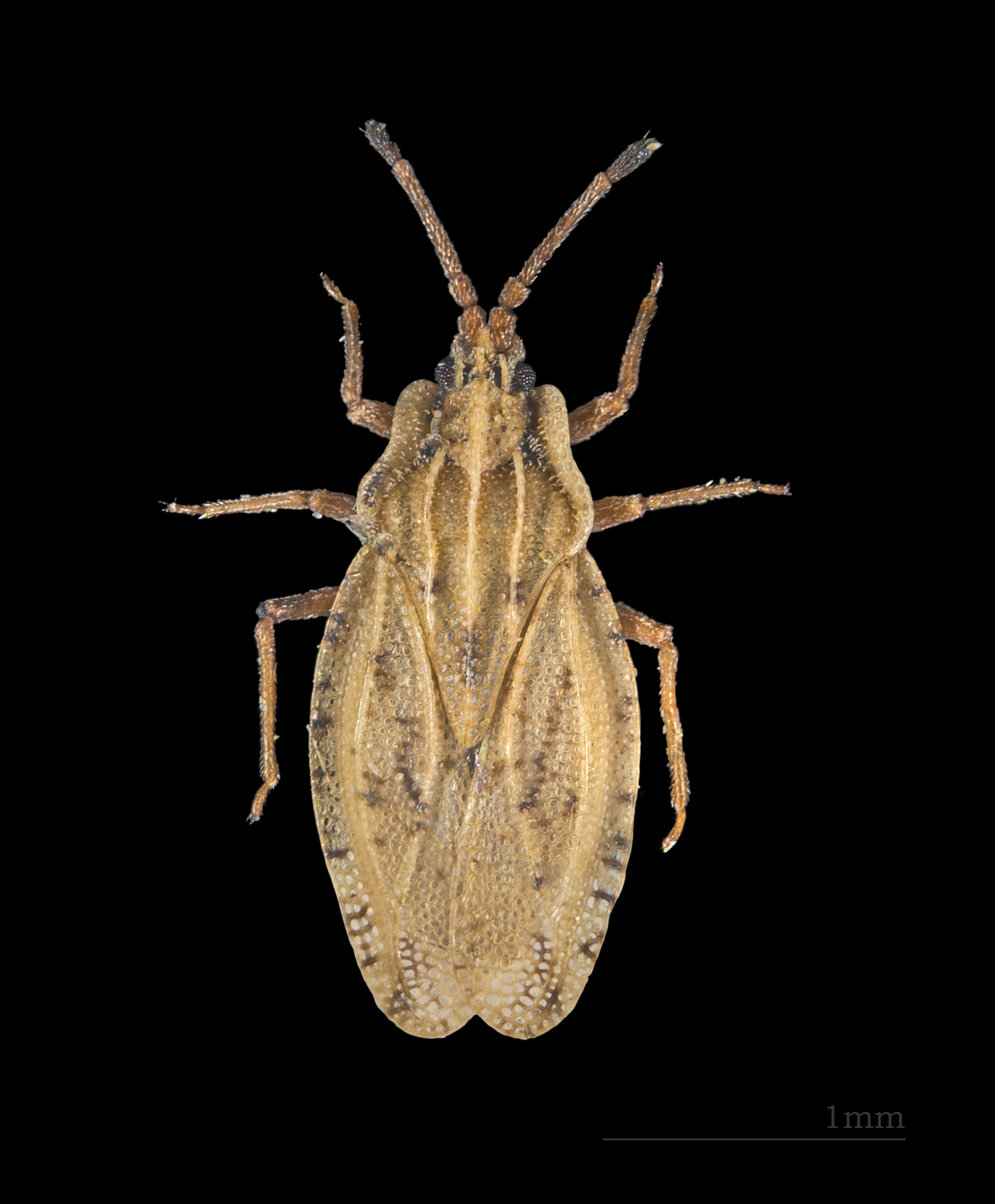
- Tingis auriculata - MHNT

Scientific classification
- Kingdom: Animalia
- Phylum: Arthropoda
- Clade: Pancrustacea
- Class: Insecta
- Order: Hemiptera
- Suborder: Heteroptera
- Family: Tingidae
- Subfamily: Tinginae; Laporte, 1832

Tribes
- Litadeini Drake and Ruhoff, 1965; Tingini Laporte, 1832; Ypsotingini Drake and Ruhoff, 1965 Acalyptaini Blatchley, 1926

= Tinginae =

Subfamily of true bugs

The Tinginae are a subfamily of lace bugs (family Tingidae). Three tribes were included in Froeschner's analysis.
