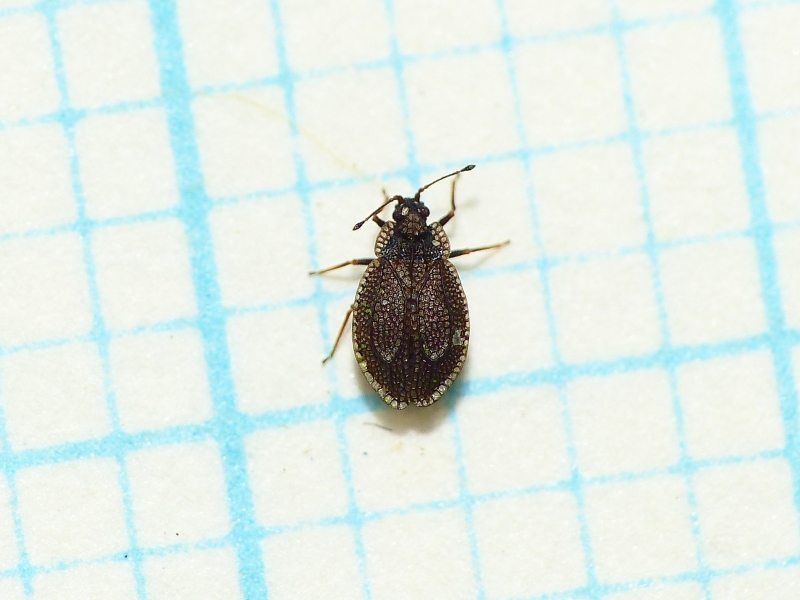
- Acalypta parvula

Scientific classification
- Domain: Eukaryota
- Kingdom: Animalia
- Phylum: Arthropoda
- Class: Insecta
- Order: Hemiptera
- Suborder: Heteroptera
- Family: Tingidae
- Subfamily: Tinginae
- Tribe: Tingini; Laporte, 1832

Synonyms
- Litadeini Drake and Ruhoff, 1965; Ypsotingini Drake and Ruhoff, 1965

= Tingini =

Tribe of true bugs

Tingini is a tribe of lace bugs in the family Tingidae. There are at least 250 genera and 2,400 described species in Tingini.

ITIS Taxonomic notes:

- The family-group name Tingidae is attributed to Laporte, but the year is variously given as 1831 to 1833. At the superfamily rank there is a potential priority conflict between Tingoidea Laporte (1831-1833?) and Miroidea Hahn (1831-1833?), as the family group name Miridae is attributed to Hahn, and is variously dated to 1831 to 1833, as well. Until this issue is resolved, ITIS will follow the common practice of using Miroidea over Tingoidea, and will leave the various family-group names (ranked from tribe to superfamily, see Principle of Coordination) without authorship.
- Note that per ICZN Opinion 143, the family name is Tingidae (not Tingitidae, nor Tingiidae), so the stem is Ting-, and the correctly formed tribe name would be Tingini (not Tingitini, nor Tingiini).

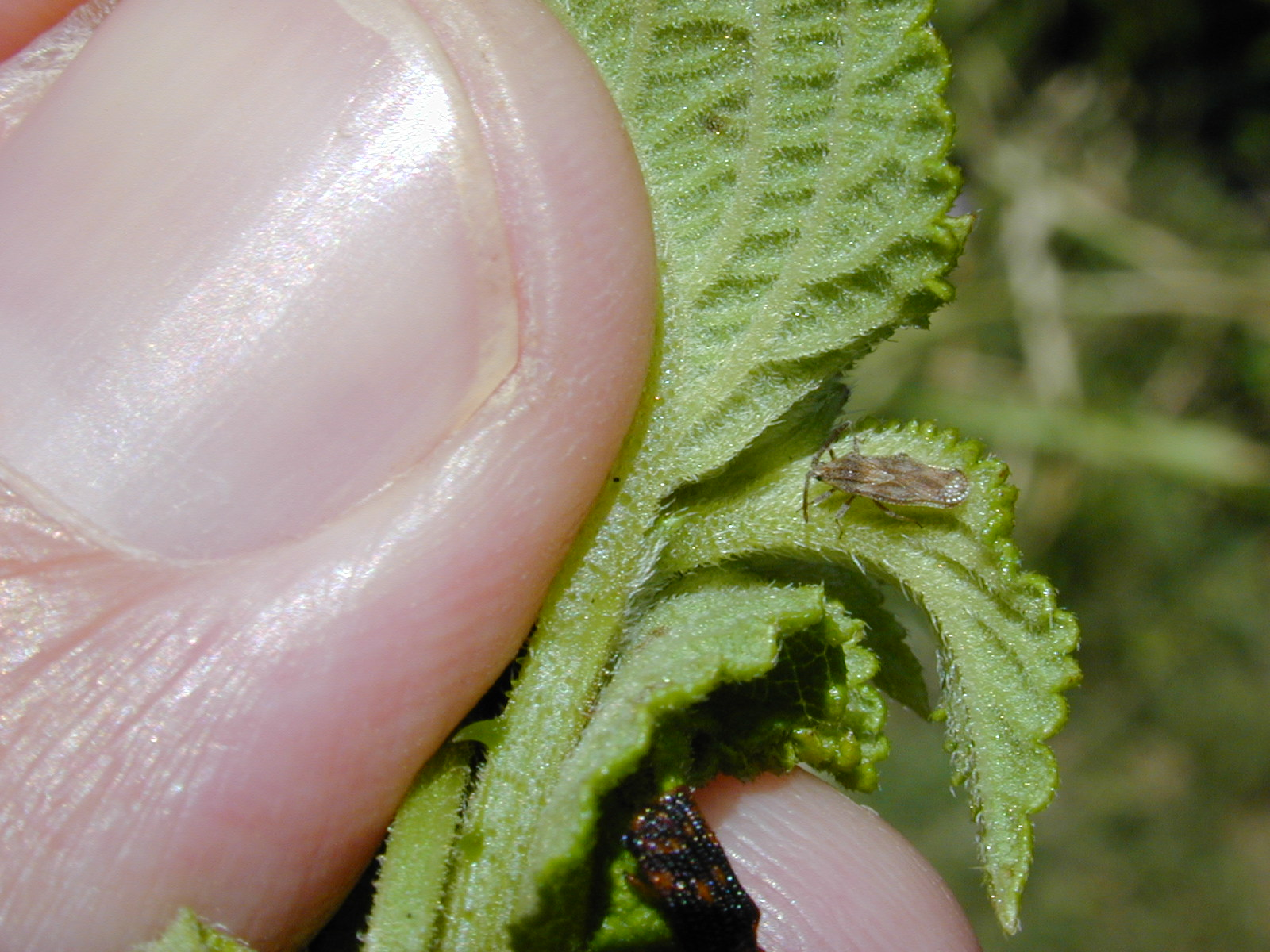
Teleonemia scrupulosa

== Selected genera ==
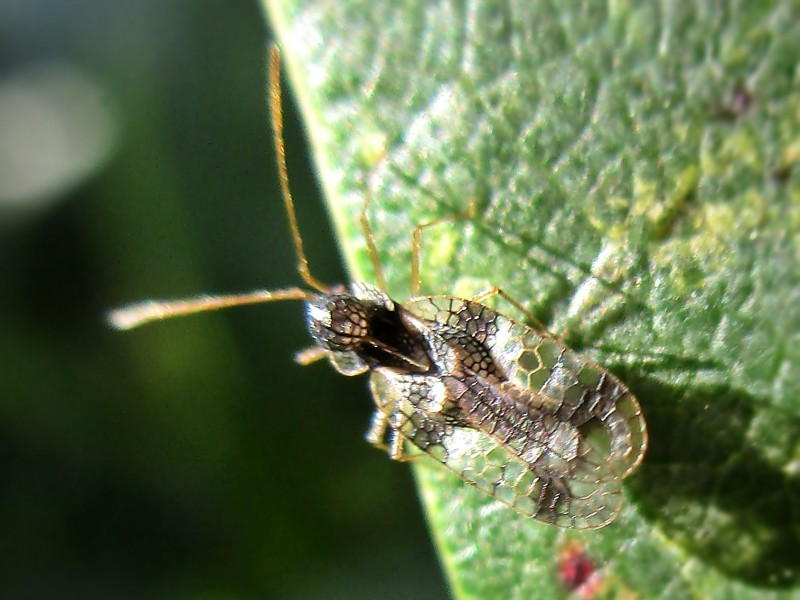
Stephanitis takeyai

An incomplete list of Tingini genera includes:

- Abdastartus Distant, 1910
- Acalypta Westwood, 1840
- Acanthocheila Stål, 1858
- Aeopelys Drake and Ruhoff, 1965
- Agramma Stephens, 1829
- Atheas Champion, 1898
- Bako Schouteden, 1923
- Belenus Distant, 1909
- Bunia Schouteden, 1955
- Calotingis Drake, 1918
- Campylosteira Fieber, 1844
- Catoplatus Spinola, 1837
- Corythucha Stål, 1873
- Derephysia Spinola, 1837
- Diconocoris Mayr, 1865
- Dictyla Stål, 1874
- Dictyonota Curtis, 1827
- Kalama Puton in Lethierry and Puton, 1876
- Lasiacantha Stål, 1873
- Oncochila Stål, 1873
- Physatocheila Fieber, 1844
- Sinuessa Horváth, 1910
- Stephanitis Stål, 1873
- Parada Horváth, 1925
- Teleonemia Costa, 1864
- Tigava Stål, 1858
- Tingis Fabricius, 1803
- Vatiga Drake & Hambleton, 1946
