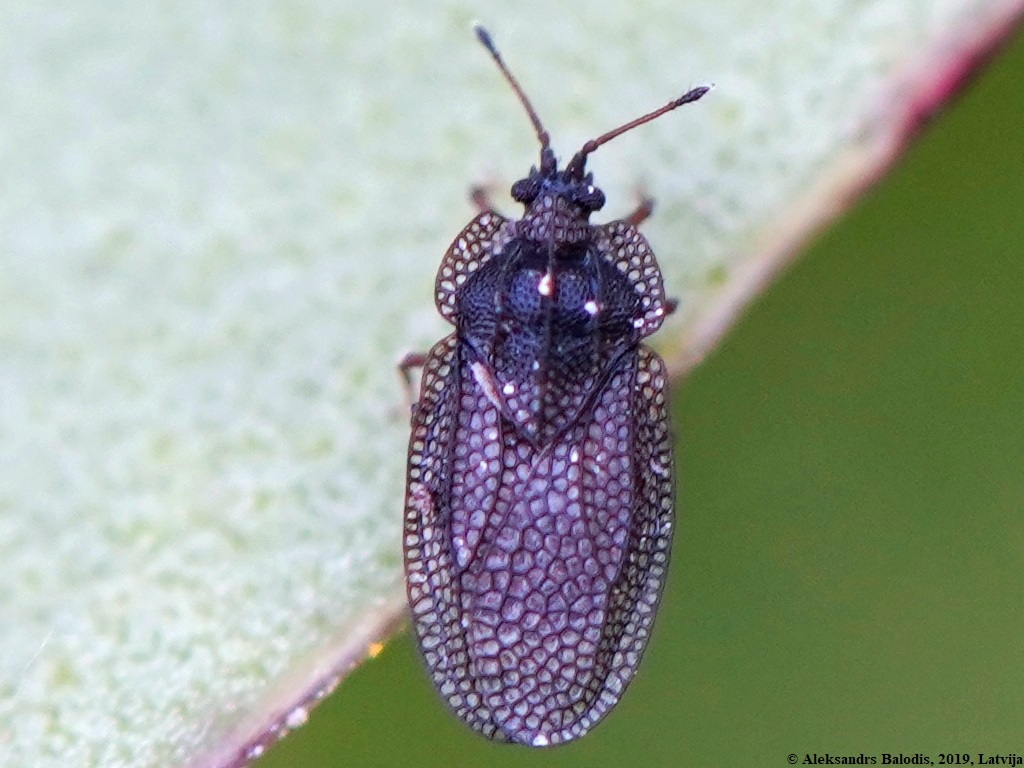
- Acalypta marginata

Scientific classification
- Kingdom: Animalia
- Phylum: Arthropoda
- Clade: Pancrustacea
- Class: Insecta
- Order: Hemiptera
- Suborder: Heteroptera
- Family: Tingidae
- Tribe: Acalyptaini
- Genus: Acalypta; Westwood, 1840

Synonyms
- Drakella Bergroth, 1922; Fenestrella Osborn & Drake, 1916; Orthosteira Fieber, 1844; Orthostira Fieber, 1861

= Acalypta =

Genus of true bugs

Acalypta is a genus of lace bugs in the family Tingidae. This genus is closely related to the genera Dictyonota, Kalama, Derephysia and Recaredus in the tribe Acalyptaini.

== Species ==
- Acalypta acutangula (Jakovlev, 1880)
- Acalypta anatolica Josifov, 1967
- Acalypta barberi Drake, 1934
- Acalypta brunnea (Germar, 1836)
- Acalypta carinata (Panzer, 1806)
- Acalypta carpathica Horváth, 1905
- Acalypta cooleyi Drake, 1917 (Cooley's tingid)
- Acalypta costata Zheng in Zheng and Liu, 1992
- Acalypta detrita Péricart, 1992
- Acalypta duryi Drake, 1930
- Acalypta elegans Horvath, 1906
- Acalypta elinoides (Jakovlev, 1893)
- Acalypta finitima (Puton, 1884)
- Acalypta formosana Tomokuni, 1992
- Acalypta gracilis (Fieber, 1844)
- Acalypta hellenica Reuter, 1888
- Acalypta heteropepla Horváth, 1907
- Acalypta hirashimai Takeya, 1962
- Acalypta hoberlandti Roubal, 1958
- Acalypta irregularis Péricart, 1981
- Acalypta laurae Froeschner, 1991
- Acalypta lillianis Torre-bueno, 1916
- Acalypta lorae Froeschner, 1991
- Acalypta marginata (Wolff, 1804)
- Acalypta miyamotoi Takeya, 1962
- Acalypta mniophila Drake and Ruhoff, 1959
- Acalypta mongolica Golub, 1973
- Acalypta montana Hoberlandt, 1944
- Acalypta musci (Schrank, 1781)
- Acalypta nepalensis Péricart, 1985
- Acalypta nigrina (Fallén, 1807)
- Acalypta nigrinervis Stål, 1874
- Acalypta nyctalis Drake, 1928
- Acalypta parvula (Fallén, 1807)
- Acalypta platycheila (Fieber, 1844)
- Acalypta pulchra Stusák, 1961
- Acalypta ruhoffae Froeschner, 1976
- Acalypta samara (Puton, 1887)
- Acalypta saundersi (Downes, 1927)
- Acalypta sauteri Drake, 1942
- Acalypta sejuncta Horváth, 1905
- Acalypta sibirica Jakovlev, 1903
- Acalypta sordida (Jakovlev, 1893)
- Acalypta spinifrousa Jing, 1980
- Acalypta subtilis (Reuter, 1882)
- Acalypta susanae Allen, Carlton and Tedder, 1988
- Acalypta suturalis (Puton, 1879)
- Acalypta swatensis Péricart, 1985
- Acalypta thomsonii Stål, 1873
- Acalypta tomokunii Péricart, 2000
- Acalypta tsurugisana Tomokuni, 1972
- Acalypta uniseriata (Puton, 1879)
- Acalypta vanduzeei Drake, 1928
- Acalypta vandykei Drake, 1928
- Acalypta visolensis Péricart, 1976
- Acalypta viti Péricart, 1992
