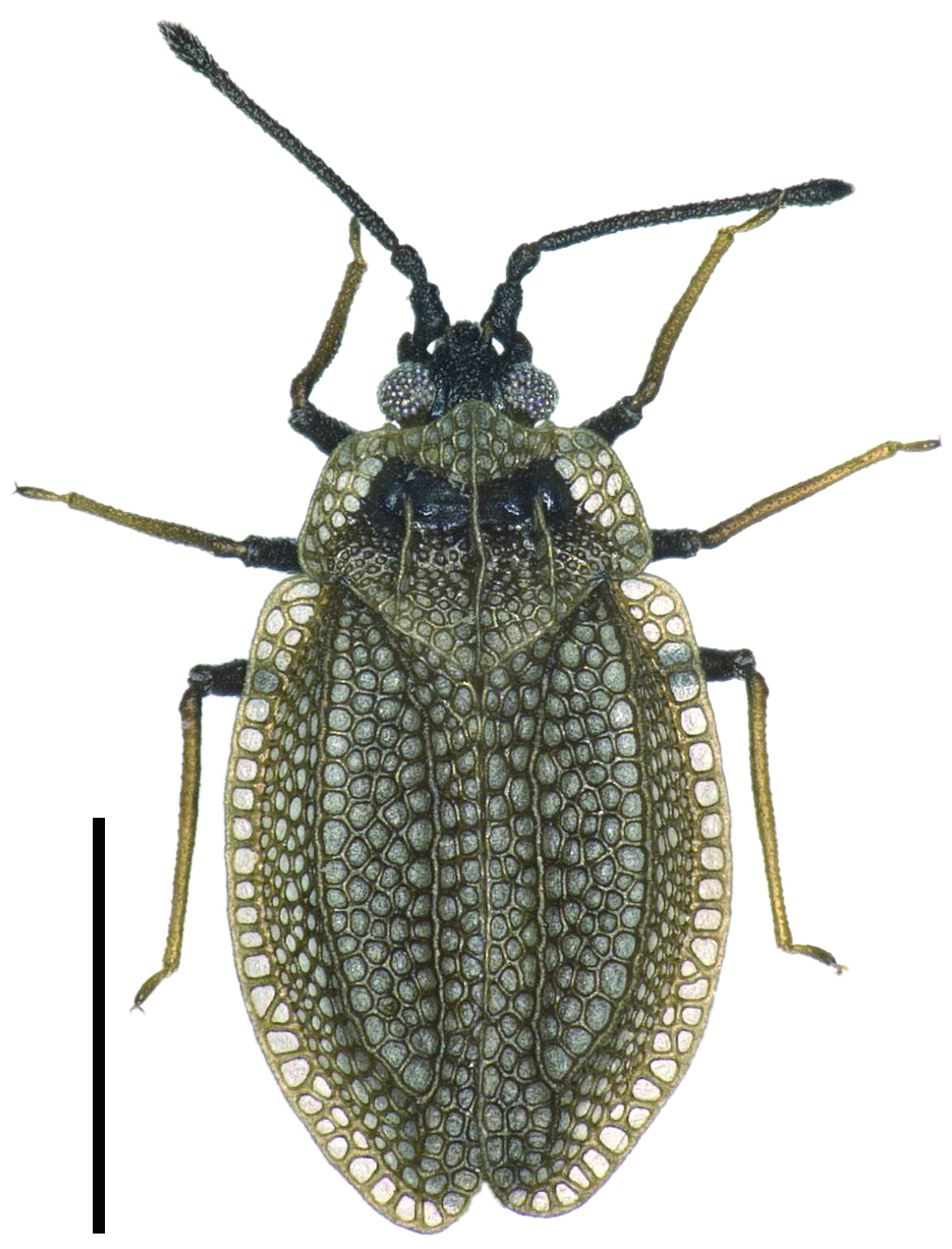

Scientific classification
- Kingdom: Animalia
- Phylum: Arthropoda
- Class: Insecta
- Order: Hemiptera
- Suborder: Heteroptera
- Family: Tingidae
- Genus: Acalypta
- Species: A. marginata

Binomial name
- Acalypta marginata (Wolff, 1804)

Synonyms
- Acanthia marginata Wolff, 1804

= Acalypta marginata =

Species of insect

Acalypta marginata is a species of lace bug in the family Tingidae. It is found throughout the Palearctic and in three eastern Asian countries: Japan, Korea and Mongolia.

It was originally described in 1804 by Johann Friedrich Wolff.

Acalypta marginata seems to prefer drier habitats but has been recorded from a diverse range of habitat types including humid treeless communities, dry grasslands, humid/riverine woodlands and dry forests.

== Gallery ==
Different views of Acalypta marginata
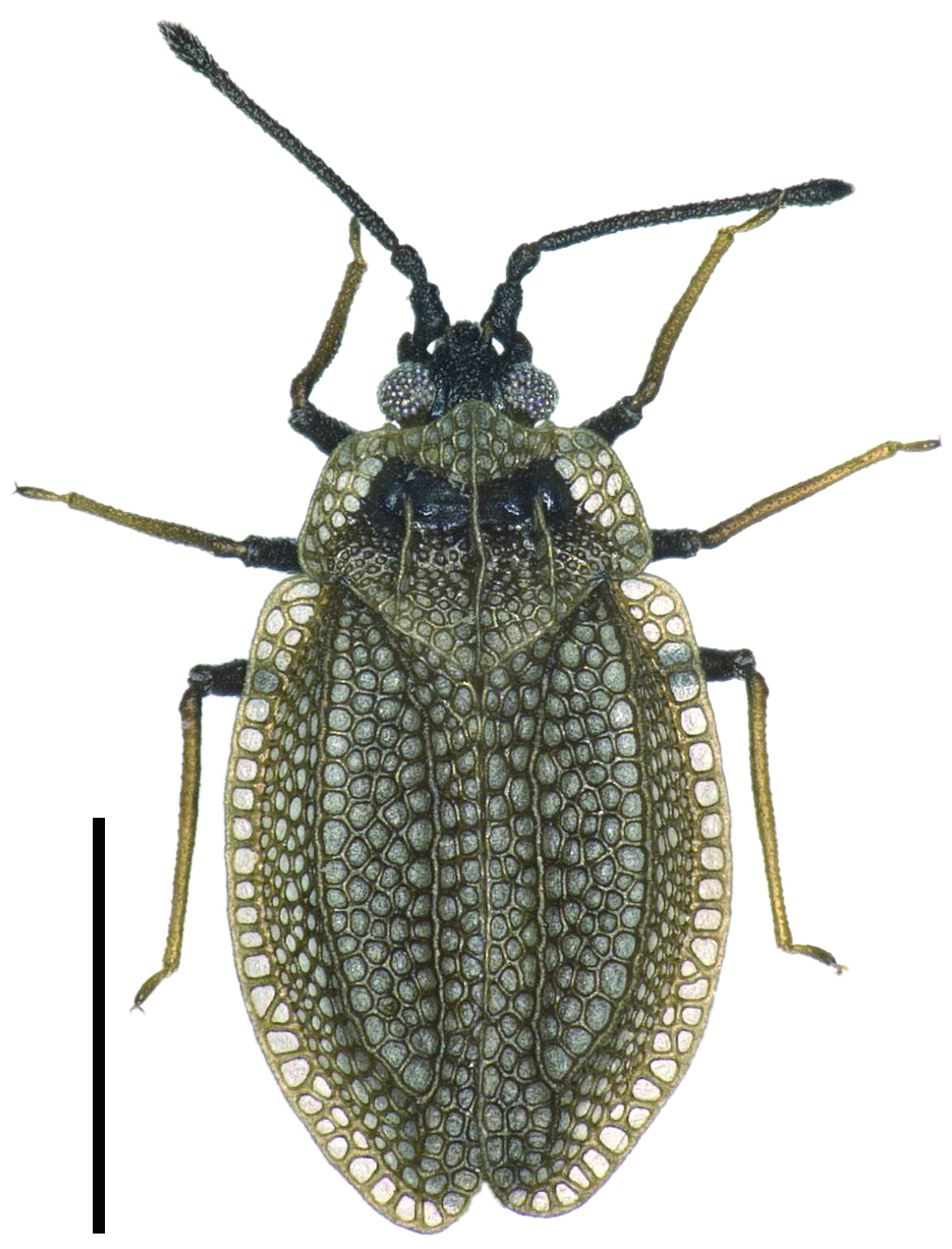
Dorsal habitus image of a brachypterous male Acalypta marginata (scale bar 1.0mm).

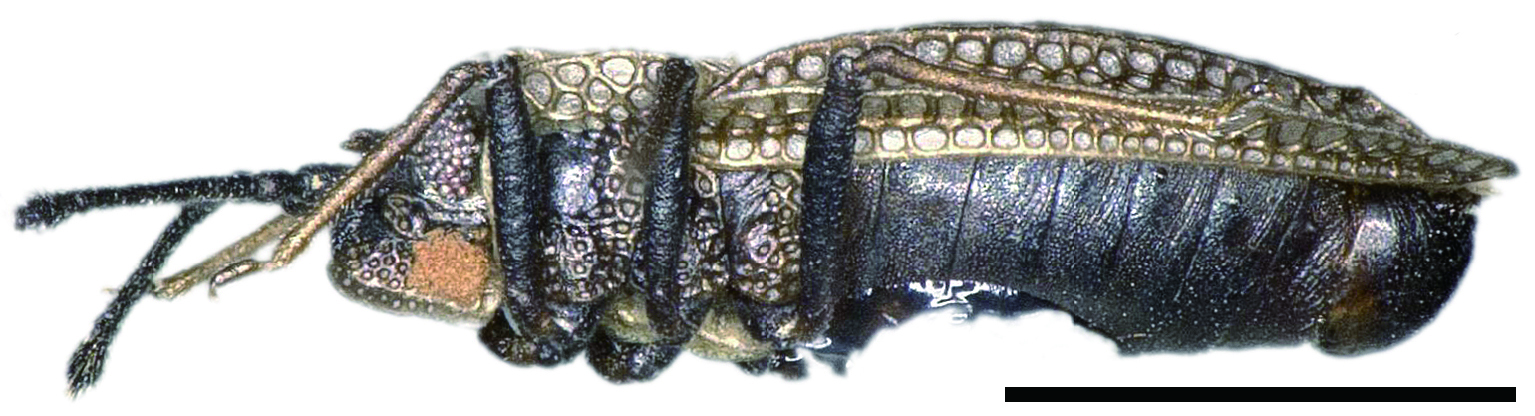
Lateral habitus image of a brachypterous male Acalypta marginata (scale bar 1.0mm).

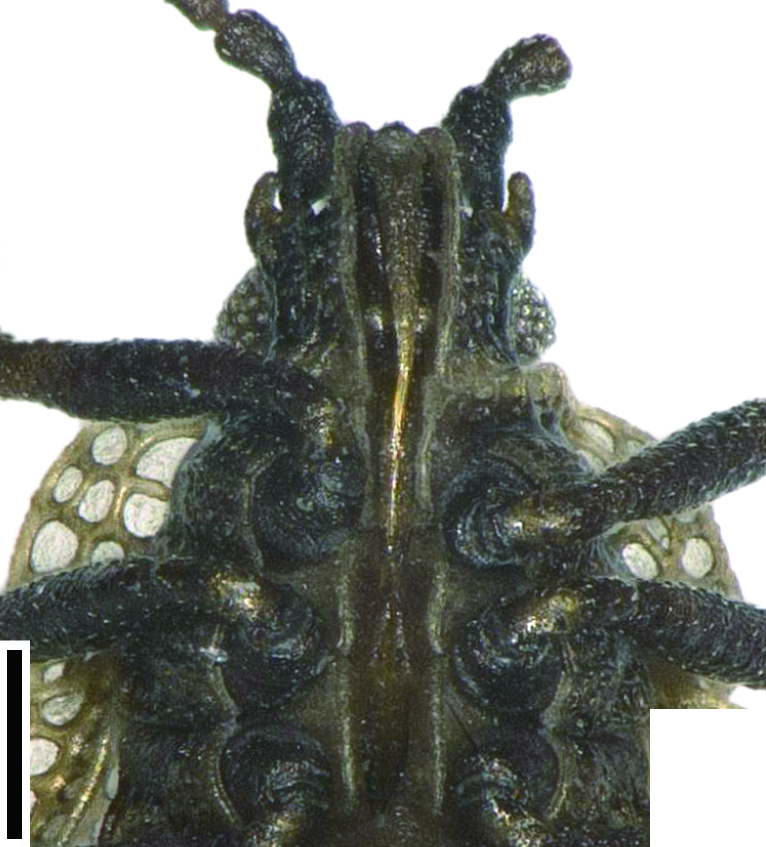
Close-up of the rostrum of Acalypta marginata (scale bar 0.2mm).
