= Acalypta hellenica =

Scientific classification
- Domain: Eukaryota
- Kingdom: Animalia
- Phylum: Arthropoda
- Class: Insecta
- Order: Hemiptera
- Suborder: Heteroptera
- Family: Tingidae
- Genus: Acalypta
- Species: A. hellenica

Binomial name
- Acalypta hellenica Panzer, 1806

Species of true bug

Acalypta hellenica is a species of bug belonging to the Tingidae family and Tinginae subfamily. It can be found in Bosnia, Bulgaria, Canary Islands, Croatia, France, Denmark, Greece, Italy, Spain, and Ukraine.
