= Acalypta elegans =

Scientific classification
- Domain: Eukaryota
- Kingdom: Animalia
- Phylum: Arthropoda
- Class: Insecta
- Order: Hemiptera
- Suborder: Heteroptera
- Family: Tingidae
- Genus: Acalypta
- Species: A. elegans

Binomial name
- Acalypta elegans Horvath, 1906

Species of true bug

Acalypta elegans is a species in the family Tingidae ("lace bugs"), in the order Hemiptera ("true bugs, cicadas, hoppers, aphids and allies"). The distribution range of Acalypta elegans includes Europe, Northern Asia (excluding China), and North America.
