= Acalypta saundersi =

Scientific classification
- Domain: Eukaryota
- Kingdom: Animalia
- Phylum: Arthropoda
- Class: Insecta
- Order: Hemiptera
- Suborder: Heteroptera
- Family: Tingidae
- Tribe: Tingini
- Genus: Acalypta
- Species: A. saundersi

Binomial name
- Acalypta saundersi (Downes, 1927)

Synonyms
- Drakella saundersi Downes, 1927

Species of true bug

Acalypta saundersi is a species of lace bug in the family Tingidae. It is found in North America.
