= Acalypta cooleyi =

Scientific classification
- Domain: Eukaryota
- Kingdom: Animalia
- Phylum: Arthropoda
- Class: Insecta
- Order: Hemiptera
- Suborder: Heteroptera
- Family: Tingidae
- Genus: Acalypta
- Species: A. cooleyi

Binomial name
- Acalypta cooleyi Drake, 1917

Species of true bug

Acalypta cooleyi, or Cooley's tingid, is a species of lace bug in the family Tingidae. It is found in Europe and Northern Asia (excluding China), North America, and Southern Asia.
