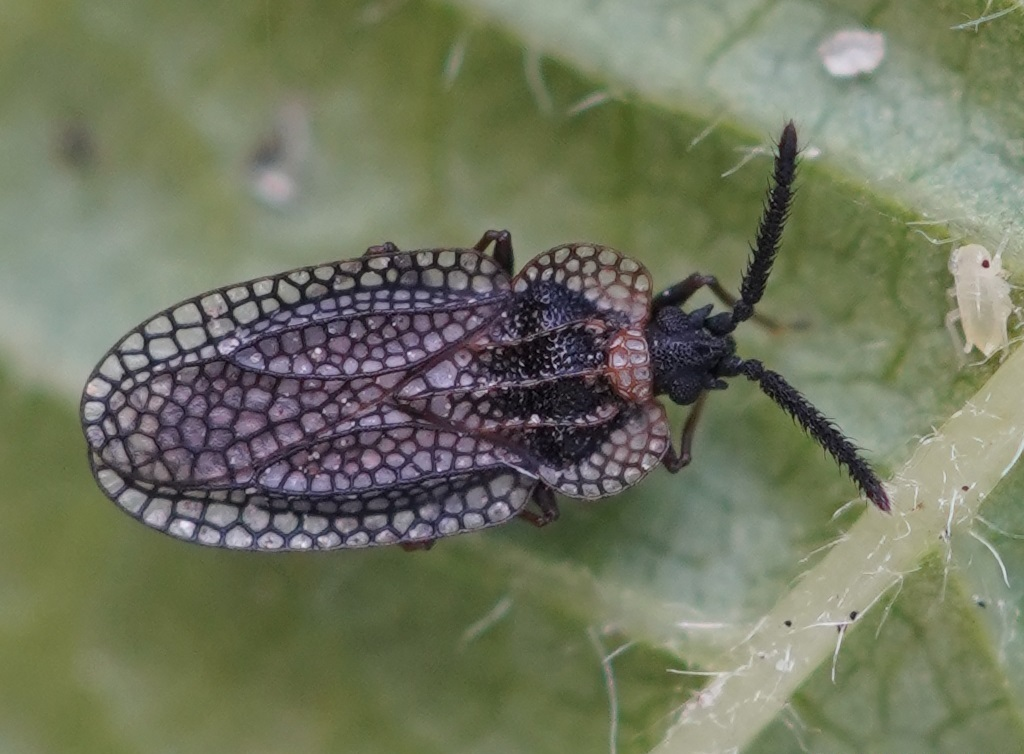

Scientific classification
- Domain: Eukaryota
- Kingdom: Animalia
- Phylum: Arthropoda
- Class: Insecta
- Order: Hemiptera
- Suborder: Heteroptera
- Family: Tingidae
- Genus: Kalama
- Species: K. tricornis

Binomial name
- Kalama tricornis (Schrank, 1801)

Synonyms
- Acanthia tricornis Schrank, 1801; Dictyonota tricornis cicur Horváth, 1905

= Kalama tricornis =

Species of true bug

Kalama tricornis, the gorse lacebug, is a species of lace bug in the family Tingidae.

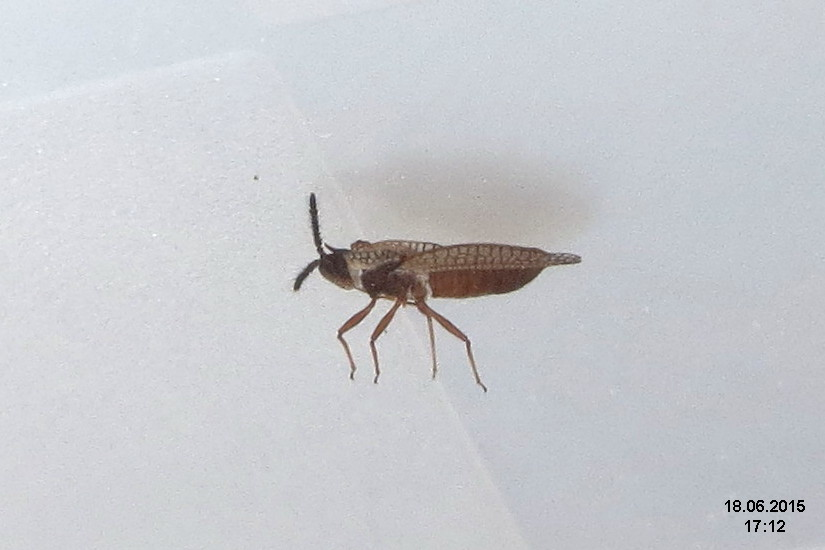
Gorse lacebug, Kalama tricornis
