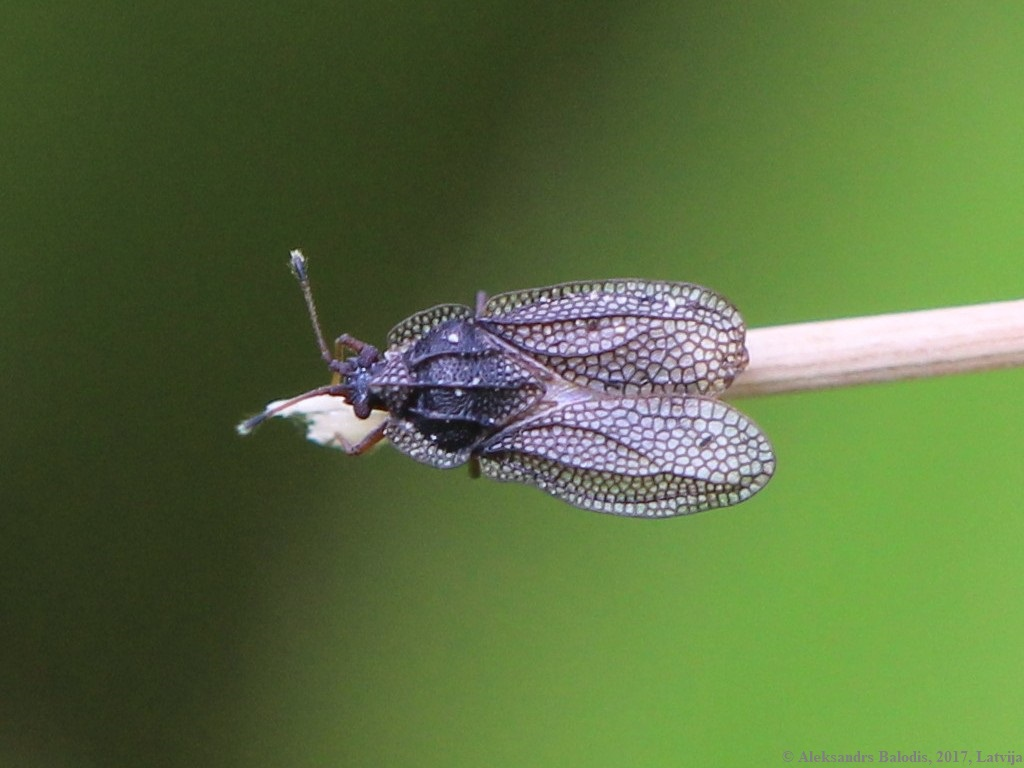

Scientific classification
- Domain: Eukaryota
- Kingdom: Animalia
- Phylum: Arthropoda
- Class: Insecta
- Order: Hemiptera
- Suborder: Heteroptera
- Family: Tingidae
- Genus: Acalypta
- Species: A. parvula

Binomial name
- Acalypta parvula (Fallén, 1807)

Synonyms
- Tingis parvula Fallén, 1807

= Acalypta parvula =

Species of true bug

Acalypta parvula is a species of lace bug in the family Tingidae. It is found in Africa, Europe and Northern Asia (excluding China), and North America.
