= Acalypta nyctalis =

Scientific classification
- Domain: Eukaryota
- Kingdom: Animalia
- Phylum: Arthropoda
- Class: Insecta
- Order: Hemiptera
- Suborder: Heteroptera
- Family: Tingidae
- Tribe: Tingini
- Genus: Acalypta
- Species: A. nyctalis

Binomial name
- Acalypta nyctalis Drake, 1928

Species of true bug

Acalypta nyctalis is a species of lace bug in the family Tingidae. It is found in North America.
