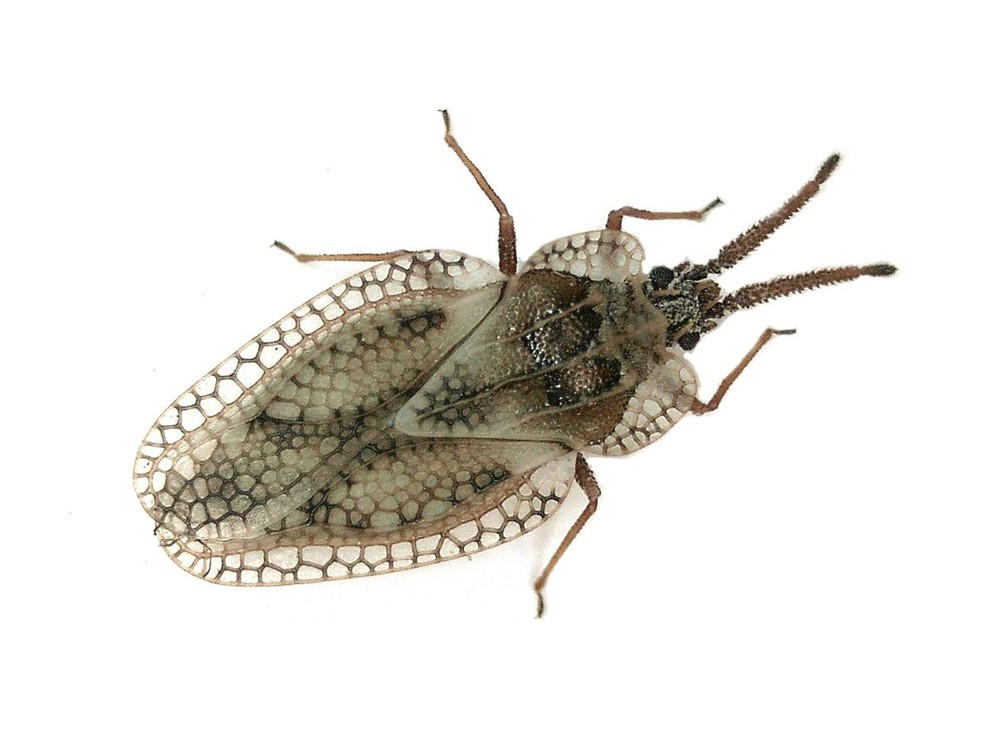

Scientific classification
- Domain: Eukaryota
- Kingdom: Animalia
- Phylum: Arthropoda
- Class: Insecta
- Order: Hemiptera
- Suborder: Heteroptera
- Family: Tingidae
- Genus: Dictyonota
- Species: D. fuliginosa

Binomial name
- Dictyonota fuliginosa Costa, 1855

= Dictyonota fuliginosa =

Species of true bug

Dictyonota fuliginosa is a species of lace bug in the family Tingidae. It is found in Europe and Northern Asia (excluding China) and North America.
