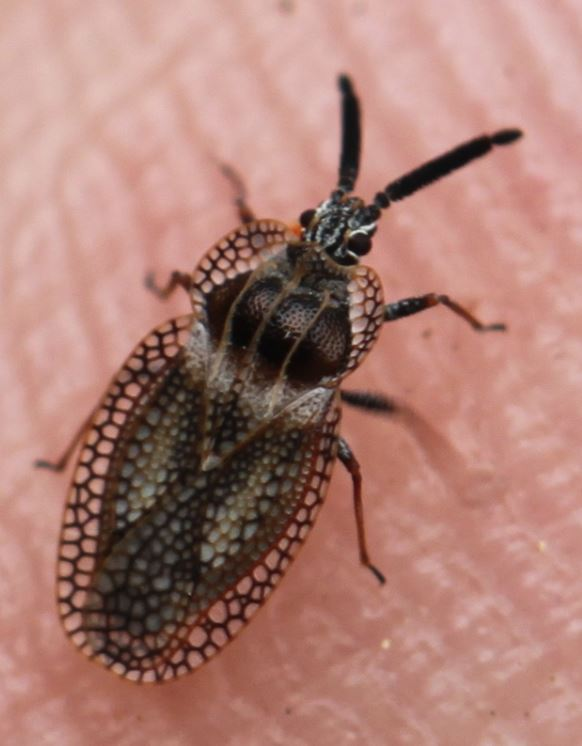
- Dictyonota strichnocera

Scientific classification
- Kingdom: Animalia
- Phylum: Arthropoda
- Class: Insecta
- Order: Hemiptera
- Suborder: Heteroptera
- Family: Tingidae
- Tribe: Ypsotingini
- Genus: Dictyonota; Curtis, 1827

Synonyms
- Biskria Puton, 1874; Notosima Stål, 1874; Scraulia Kerzhner in Kerzhner and Jaczewski, 1964

= Dictyonota =

Genus of true bugs

Dictyonota is a genus of mostly European lace bugs in the family Tingidae. There are more than 60 described species in Dictyonota.

== Species ==
These 66 species belong to the genus Dictyonota:

- Dictyonota acalyptoides Golub, 1975
- Dictyonota aethiops Horvath, 1905
- Dictyonota albipennis Baerensprung, 1858
- Dictyonota aridula Jakovlev, 1902
- Dictyonota astragali Stusák and Önder, 1982
- Dictyonota atlantica Péricart, 1981
- Dictyonota atraphaxius Golub, 1975
- Dictyonota beckeri (Jakovlev, 1871)
- Dictyonota bishareenica (Linnavuori, 1965)
- Dictyonota brevicornis Ferrari, 1884
- Dictyonota coquereli Puton, 1876
- Dictyonota coriacea Asanova, 1970
- Dictyonota cretica Péricart, 1979
- Dictyonota dlabolai Hoberlandt, 1974
- Dictyonota eckerleini Péricart, 1979
- Dictyonota ephedrae (Kerzhner, 1964)
- Dictyonota froeschneri Rodrigues, 1970
- Dictyonota fuentei Puton, 1895
- Dictyonota fuliginosa Costa, 1855
- Dictyonota gobica Golub, 1975
- Dictyonota gracilicornis Puton, 1874
- Dictyonota guentheri (Wagner, 1967)
- Dictyonota halimodendri Golub, 1975
- Dictyonota henschi Puton, 1892
- Dictyonota hispanica (Gómez-Menor, 1955)
- Dictyonota horvathi (Kiritshenko, 1914)
- Dictyonota iberica Horvath, 1905
- Dictyonota inermis Golub, 1975
- Dictyonota josifovi (Seidenstücker, 1968)
- Dictyonota kerzhneri Golub, 1975
- Dictyonota koreana Lee, 1967
- Dictyonota lepida (Horváth, 1905)
- Dictyonota levantina Péricart, 1981
- Dictyonota lugubris Fieber, 1861
- Dictyonota marmorea Baerensprung, 1858
- Dictyonota marqueti Puton, 1879
- Dictyonota michaili Günther, 2008
- Dictyonota mitoris Drake and Hsiung, 1936
- Dictyonota moralesi Ribes, 1975
- Dictyonota nevadensis Gómez-Menor, 1955
- Dictyonota nigricosta (Kerzhner and Josifov, 1966)
- Dictyonota oblita Péricart, 1981
- Dictyonota opaca (Linnavuori, 1965)
- Dictyonota oromii Ribes, 1979
- Dictyonota pakistana Drake and Maldonado, 1959
- Dictyonota pardoi Ribes, 1975
- Dictyonota petrifracta Golub and Popov, 2000
- Dictyonota phoenicea Seidenstücker, 1963
- Dictyonota pulchella Costa, 1863
- Dictyonota pulchricornis (Kerzhner and Josifov, 1966)
- Dictyonota pusana Drake & Maa, 1955
- Dictyonota putonii Stål, 1874
- Dictyonota rectipilis (Asanova, 1970)
- Dictyonota reuteri Horvath, 1906
- Dictyonota ribesi Péricart, 1979
- Dictyonota salsolae Golub, 1975
- Dictyonota sareptana Jakovlev, 1876
- Dictyonota scutellaris Linnavuori, 1977
- Dictyonota sicardi (Puton, 1894)
- Dictyonota strichnocera Fieber, 1844
- Dictyonota teydensis Lindberg, 1936
- Dictyonota theryi (Montandon, 1897)
- Dictyonota tricornis (Schrank, 1801)
- Dictyonota vinokurovi Golub, 1979
- Dictyonota xilingola Jing, 1980
- † Dictyonota petrifacta Golub & Popov, 2000
