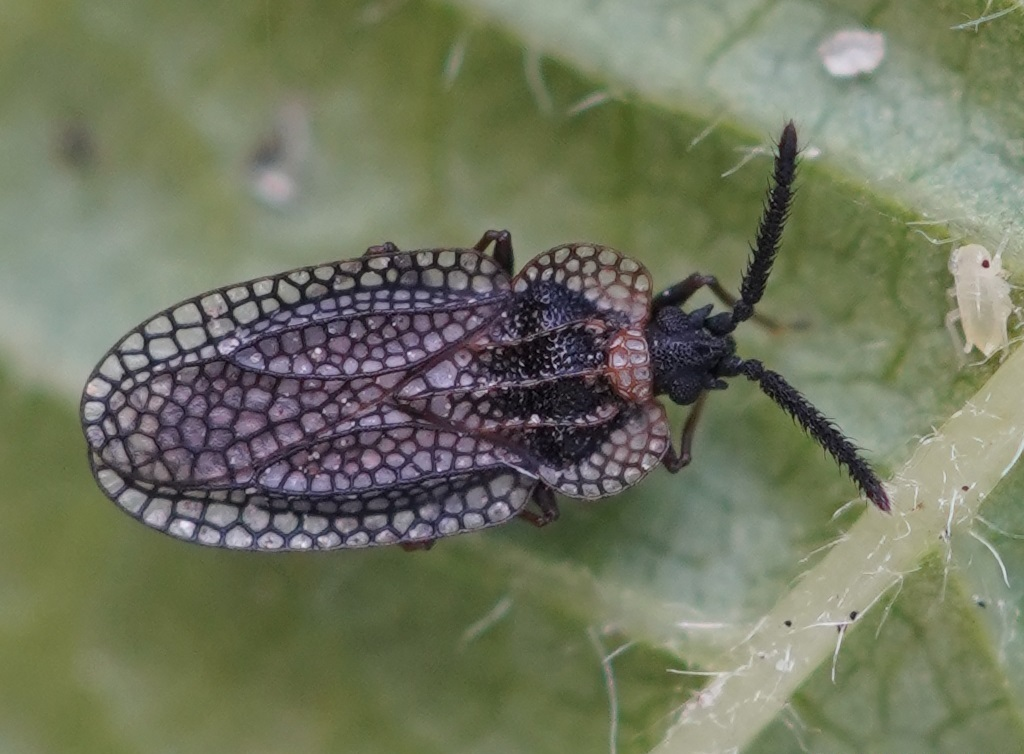
- Kalama tricornis

Scientific classification
- Domain: Eukaryota
- Kingdom: Animalia
- Phylum: Arthropoda
- Class: Insecta
- Order: Hemiptera
- Suborder: Heteroptera
- Family: Tingidae
- Tribe: Tingini
- Genus: Kalama; Puton in Lethierry & Puton, 1876

Synonyms
- Dictyonota (Alcletha) Kirkaldy, 1900; Dictyonota (Elina) Ferrari, 1878; Dictyonota (Kalama) Puton in Lethierry and Puton, 1876

= Kalama (bug) =

Genus of true bugs

Kalama is a genus of lace bugs in the family Tingidae. There are at least 30 described species in Kalama.

== Species ==
These 33 species belong to the genus Kalama:

- Kalama acalyptoides (Golub, 1975)
- Kalama aethiops (Horváth, 1905)
- Kalama aridula (Jakovlev, 1902)
- Kalama beckeri (Jakovlev, 1871)
- Kalama brevicornis (Ferrari, 1884)
- Kalama coquereli Puton in Lethierry and Puton, 1876
- Kalama coriacea (Asanova, 1970)
- Kalama cretica (Péricart, 1979)
- Kalama eckerleini (Péricart, 1979)
- Kalama froeschneri (Duarte Rodrigues, 1970)
- Kalama fuentei (Puton, 1895)
- Kalama henschi (Puton, 1892)
- Kalama iberica (Horváth, 1905)
- Kalama inermis (Golub, 1975)
- Kalama josifovi Péricart, 1992
- Kalama kiritshenkoi Golub, 2005
- Kalama koreana (Lee, 1967)
- Kalama levantina (Péricart, 1981)
- Kalama lugubris (Fieber, 1861)
- Kalama marqueti (Puton, 1879)
- Kalama montisclari Ribes and Pagola-Carte, 2008
- Kalama moralesi (Ribes, 1975)
- Kalama oromii (Ribes, 1978)
- Kalama pusana (Drake and Maa, 1955)
- Kalama putonii (Stål, 1874)
- Kalama reuteri (Horváth, 1906)
- Kalama ribesi (Péricart, 1979)
- Kalama scutellaris (Linnavuori, 1977)
- Kalama sicardi (Puton, 1894)
- Kalama theryi Montandon, 1897
- Kalama tricornis (Schrank, 1801) (gorse lacebug)
- Kalama vinokurovi (Golub, 1979)
- Kalama wangi Golub, Luo and Vinokurov, 2012
