= Johann Friedrich Wolff =

German biologist (1778–1806)

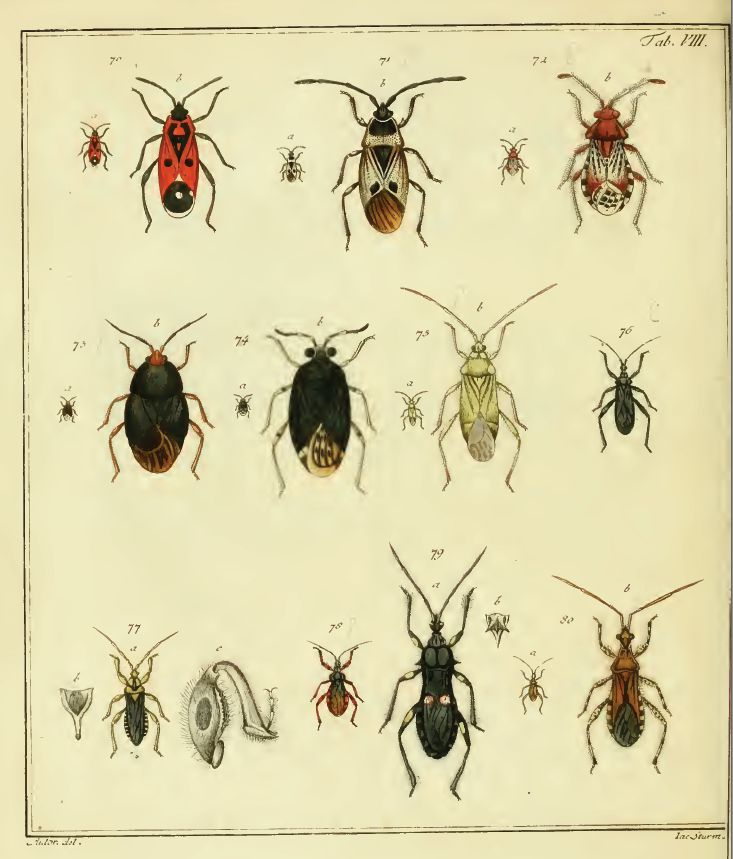
Plate VIII from Icones Cimicum descriptionibus illustratae

Johann Friedrich Wolff (1778- 1806) was a German physician, botanist, entomologist and natural history illustrator. He wrote and illustrated Commentatio de Lemna. Altdorfii et Norimbergae (1801), Icones Cimicum descriptionibus illustratae. Erlangen 1800-1811 and some short papers. Wolff is the author of several genera and species of Hemiptera.
