= Liparetrus pauxillus =

Scientific classification
- Kingdom: Animalia
- Phylum: Arthropoda
- Clade: Pancrustacea
- Class: Insecta
- Order: Coleoptera
- Suborder: Polyphaga
- Infraorder: Scarabaeiformia
- Family: Scarabaeidae
- Genus: Liparetrus
- Species: L. pauxillus

Binomial name
- Liparetrus pauxillus Britton, 1980

Species of beetle

Liparetrus pauxillus is a species of beetle of the family Scarabaeidae. It is found in Australia (Western Australia).

== Taxonomy ==
This species belongs to the alienus species group. The defining characters of this group include setae on the disc of the pronotum and the disc of the elytra.

== Description ==
Adults reach a length of about 4.5 mm (0.18 in). They are completely pale yellowish brown.
