= Liparetrus carnabyi =

Scientific classification
- Kingdom: Animalia
- Phylum: Arthropoda
- Clade: Pancrustacea
- Class: Insecta
- Order: Coleoptera
- Suborder: Polyphaga
- Infraorder: Scarabaeiformia
- Family: Scarabaeidae
- Genus: Liparetrus
- Species: L. carnabyi

Binomial name
- Liparetrus carnabyi Britton, 1980

Species of beetle

Liparetrus carnabyi is a species of beetle of the family Scarabaeidae. It is found in Australia (Western Australia).

== Taxonomy ==
This species belongs to the luridipennis species group. The defining characters of this group include setae on the disc of the pronotum.

== Description ==
Adults reach a length of about 5.6 mm (0.22 in). The head, pronotum, abdomen and ventral surface are black, while the elytra are yellowish brown with the lateral margins black. The legs are dark brown and the antennae are also dark brown, but with a black club.
