= Liparetrus karallus =

Scientific classification
- Kingdom: Animalia
- Phylum: Arthropoda
- Clade: Pancrustacea
- Class: Insecta
- Order: Coleoptera
- Suborder: Polyphaga
- Infraorder: Scarabaeiformia
- Family: Scarabaeidae
- Genus: Liparetrus
- Species: L. karallus

Binomial name
- Liparetrus karallus Britton, 1980

Species of beetle

Liparetrus karallus is a species of beetle of the family Scarabaeidae. It is found in Australia (New South Wales, South Australia, Northern Territory).

== Taxonomy ==
This species belongs to the fulvohirtus species group. The defining characters of this group include the presence of setae on the discs of the pronotum and elytra.

== Description ==
Adults reach a length of about 10–12 mm (0.39–0.47 in). The head, pronotum, ventral surface and abdomen are dark brown or black, while the elytra are light yellowish brown with a black basal area. The antennae are pale yellowish, with the ends of the lamellae dark.
