= Liparetrus collaris =

Scientific classification
- Kingdom: Animalia
- Phylum: Arthropoda
- Clade: Pancrustacea
- Class: Insecta
- Order: Coleoptera
- Suborder: Polyphaga
- Infraorder: Scarabaeiformia
- Family: Scarabaeidae
- Genus: Liparetrus
- Species: L. collaris

Binomial name
- Liparetrus collaris MacLeay, 1886

Synonyms
- Liparetrus maurus Blackburn, 1892

Species of beetle

Liparetrus collaris is a species of beetle of the family Scarabaeidae. It is found in Australia (South Australia, New South Wales, Queensland).

== Taxonomy ==
This species belongs to the concolor species group. The defining characters of this group include the absence of setae on the discs of the pronotum and elytra, while the pronotum has a fringe of setae along the anterior margin.

== Description ==
Adults reach a length of about 9–10 mm (0.35–0.39 in). They have a black body, with slightly iridescent elytra. The legs are dark brown to black and the antennae yellowish brown with a black club.
