= Liparetrus incertus =

Scientific classification
- Kingdom: Animalia
- Phylum: Arthropoda
- Clade: Pancrustacea
- Class: Insecta
- Order: Coleoptera
- Suborder: Polyphaga
- Infraorder: Scarabaeiformia
- Family: Scarabaeidae
- Genus: Liparetrus
- Species: L. incertus

Binomial name
- Liparetrus incertus Blackburn, 1905

Species of beetle

Liparetrus incertus is a species of beetle of the family Scarabaeidae. It is found in Australia (Victoria, New South Wales).

== Taxonomy ==
This species belongs to the striatus species group. The defining characters of this group include the absence of setae on the disc of the pronotum and scales or flattened, adpressed setae on the propygidium and usually also the pygidium.

== Description ==
Adults reach a length of about 6.4–8 mm (0.25–0.31 in). The head, pronotum, scutellum, abdomen and ventral surface are black or piceous, while the elytra are dark reddish brown. The legs are dark reddish brown and the antennae are also reddish brown, but with a black club.
