= Liparetrus jenkinsi =

Scientific classification
- Kingdom: Animalia
- Phylum: Arthropoda
- Clade: Pancrustacea
- Class: Insecta
- Order: Coleoptera
- Suborder: Polyphaga
- Infraorder: Scarabaeiformia
- Family: Scarabaeidae
- Genus: Liparetrus
- Species: L. jenkinsi

Binomial name
- Liparetrus jenkinsi Britton, 1959

Species of beetle

Liparetrus jenkinsi is a species of beetle of the family Scarabaeidae. It is found in Australia (Western Australia).

== Taxonomy ==
This species belongs to the striatus species group. The defining characters of this group include the absence of setae on the disc of the pronotum and scales or flattened, adpressed setae on the propygidium and usually also the pygidium.

== Description ==
Adults reach a length of about 4–6.5 mm (0.16–0.26 in). They are black, but the elytra may be yellowish brown, with the base and sometimes other margins darkened. The pygidium is sometimes yellowish brown. The antennae are reddish brown with a black club and the legs are dark reddish brown.
