= Liparetrus rubrus =

Scientific classification
- Kingdom: Animalia
- Phylum: Arthropoda
- Clade: Pancrustacea
- Class: Insecta
- Order: Coleoptera
- Suborder: Polyphaga
- Infraorder: Scarabaeiformia
- Family: Scarabaeidae
- Genus: Liparetrus
- Species: L. rubrus

Binomial name
- Liparetrus rubrus Britton, 1980

Species of beetle

Liparetrus rubrus is a species of beetle of the family Scarabaeidae. It is found in Australia (Queensland).

== Taxonomy ==
This species belongs to the rufipennis species group. The defining characters of this group include the absence of setae and scales on the disc of the pronotum.

== Description ==
Adults reach a length of about 10 mm (0.39 in). The head is black and the pronotum is bright reddish brown with black margins. The elytra are bright reddish brown with a black basal area and darkened margins. The abdomen and legs are reddish brown.
