= Liparetrus halei =

Scientific classification
- Kingdom: Animalia
- Phylum: Arthropoda
- Clade: Pancrustacea
- Class: Insecta
- Order: Coleoptera
- Suborder: Polyphaga
- Infraorder: Scarabaeiformia
- Family: Scarabaeidae
- Genus: Liparetrus
- Species: L. halei

Binomial name
- Liparetrus halei Britton, 1980

Species of beetle

Liparetrus halei is a species of beetle of the family Scarabaeidae. It is found in Australia (Queensland, Northern Territory).

== Taxonomy ==
This species belongs to the lanaticollis species group. The defining characters of this group include the absence of setae on the disc of the elytra, Furthermore, the base and apex of the elytra are usually darker than the disc.

== Description ==
Adults reach a length of about 4 mm (0.16 in). They are completely pale yellowish brown.
