= Liparetrus pusillus =

Scientific classification
- Kingdom: Animalia
- Phylum: Arthropoda
- Clade: Pancrustacea
- Class: Insecta
- Order: Coleoptera
- Suborder: Polyphaga
- Infraorder: Scarabaeiformia
- Family: Scarabaeidae
- Genus: Liparetrus
- Species: L. pusillus

Binomial name
- Liparetrus pusillus Britton, 1980

Species of beetle

Liparetrus pusillus is a species of beetle of the family Scarabaeidae. It is found in Australia (Western Australia).

== Taxonomy ==
This species belongs to the alienus species group. The defining characters of this group include setae on the disc of the pronotum and the disc of the elytra.

== Description ==
Adults reach a length of about 3.5–4.5 mm (0.14–0.18 in). The head is black. The pronotum is also black, but with yellowish brown anterior and posterior margins. The ventral surface of the thorax is black, the abdomen black or yellow and the elytra yellowish brown or brown. The legs are reddish brown or dark brown.
