= Liparetrus crassus =

Scientific classification
- Kingdom: Animalia
- Phylum: Arthropoda
- Clade: Pancrustacea
- Class: Insecta
- Order: Coleoptera
- Suborder: Polyphaga
- Infraorder: Scarabaeiformia
- Family: Scarabaeidae
- Genus: Liparetrus
- Species: L. crassus

Binomial name
- Liparetrus crassus Britton, 1980

Species of beetle

Liparetrus crassus is a species of beetle of the family Scarabaeidae. It is found in Australia (Western Australia).

== Taxonomy ==
This species belongs to the rufipennis species group. The defining characters of this group include the absence of setae and scales on the disc of the pronotum.

== Description ==
Adults reach a length of about 8.5–10 mm (0.33–0.39 in). The head and pronotum are dark reddish brown to black, while the elytra, abdomen and ventral surface are reddish or dark reddish brown.
