= Liparetrus melanocephalus =

Scientific classification
- Kingdom: Animalia
- Phylum: Arthropoda
- Clade: Pancrustacea
- Class: Insecta
- Order: Coleoptera
- Suborder: Polyphaga
- Infraorder: Scarabaeiformia
- Family: Scarabaeidae
- Genus: Liparetrus
- Species: L. melanocephalus

Binomial name
- Liparetrus melanocephalus Blackburn, 1895

Species of beetle

Liparetrus melanocephalus is a species of beetle of the family Scarabaeidae. It is found in Australia (South Australia, Western Australia).

== Taxonomy ==
This species belongs to the rufipennis species group. The defining characters of this group include the absence of setae and scales on the disc of the pronotum.

== Description ==
Adults reach a length of about 5–6 mm (0.20–0.24 in). The head is black or dark brown and the pronotum is pale yellowish brown with the anterior and posterior edges dark brown. The elytra are pale yellowish brown and the propygidium and pygidium are yellowish brown. The rest of the abdomen is dark brown. The hind legs are mostly dark brown, while the other legs are yellowish brown.
