= Liparetrus plautus =

Scientific classification
- Kingdom: Animalia
- Phylum: Arthropoda
- Clade: Pancrustacea
- Class: Insecta
- Order: Coleoptera
- Suborder: Polyphaga
- Infraorder: Scarabaeiformia
- Family: Scarabaeidae
- Genus: Liparetrus
- Species: L. plautus

Binomial name
- Liparetrus plautus Britton, 1980

Species of beetle

Liparetrus plautus is a species of beetle of the family Scarabaeidae. It is found in Australia (New South Wales).

== Taxonomy ==
This species belongs to the striatus species group. The defining characters of this group include the absence of setae on the disc of the pronotum and scales or flattened, adpressed setae on the propygidium and usually also the pygidium.

== Description ==
Adults reach a length of about 7 mm (0.28 in). The head, pronotum and scutellum are black, while the elytra are reddish brown. The abdomen is black or reddish brown and the ventral surface is black. The antennae are reddish brown with a darker club. The tarsi are reddish brown and the remainder of the legs are dark reddish brown to black.
