= Liparetrus laetus =

Scientific classification
- Kingdom: Animalia
- Phylum: Arthropoda
- Clade: Pancrustacea
- Class: Insecta
- Order: Coleoptera
- Suborder: Polyphaga
- Infraorder: Scarabaeiformia
- Family: Scarabaeidae
- Genus: Liparetrus
- Species: L. laetus

Binomial name
- Liparetrus laetus Blackburn, 1888

Synonyms
- Liparetrus basicollis Lea, 1917

Species of beetle

Liparetrus laetus is a species of beetle of the family Scarabaeidae. It is found in Australia (Western Australia).

== Taxonomy ==
This species belongs to the laetus species group.

== Description ==
Adults reach a length of about 4.5–6 mm (0.18–0.24 in). The head, pronotum and scutellum are black, while the elytra are reddish brown or brown with a black basal area. The legs are reddish to dark brown.
