= Liparetrus distinctus =

Scientific classification
- Kingdom: Animalia
- Phylum: Arthropoda
- Clade: Pancrustacea
- Class: Insecta
- Order: Coleoptera
- Suborder: Polyphaga
- Infraorder: Scarabaeiformia
- Family: Scarabaeidae
- Genus: Liparetrus
- Species: L. distinctus

Binomial name
- Liparetrus distinctus Blackburn, 1895

Species of beetle

Liparetrus distinctus is a species of beetle of the family Scarabaeidae. It is found in Australia (South Australia, New South Wales, Queensland, Northern Territory).

== Taxonomy ==
This species belongs to the rufipennis species group. The defining characters of this group include the absence of setae and scales on the disc of the pronotum.

== Description ==
Adults reach a length of about 6–7.5 mm (0.24–0.30 in). They are yellowish brown, with the frons darker than the clypeus and pronotum.
