= Liparetrus bellarus =

Scientific classification
- Kingdom: Animalia
- Phylum: Arthropoda
- Clade: Pancrustacea
- Class: Insecta
- Order: Coleoptera
- Suborder: Polyphaga
- Infraorder: Scarabaeiformia
- Family: Scarabaeidae
- Genus: Liparetrus
- Species: L. bellarus

Binomial name
- Liparetrus bellarus Britton, 1980

Species of beetle

Liparetrus bellarus is a species of beetle of the family Scarabaeidae. It is found in Australia (Western Australia).

== Taxonomy ==
This species belongs to the squamiger species group. The defining characters of this group include the presence of setae on the disc of the pronotum.

== Description ==
Adults reach a length of about 5.5 mm (0.22 in). The head, pronotum, abdomen and basal area of the elytra are black, while the rest of the elytra is reddish yellow. The antennae are yellow, with the club mostly black.
