= Liparetrus diversus =

Scientific classification
- Kingdom: Animalia
- Phylum: Arthropoda
- Clade: Pancrustacea
- Class: Insecta
- Order: Coleoptera
- Suborder: Polyphaga
- Infraorder: Scarabaeiformia
- Family: Scarabaeidae
- Genus: Liparetrus
- Species: L. diversus

Binomial name
- Liparetrus diversus Blackburn, 1888

Species of beetle

Liparetrus diversus is a species of beetle of the family Scarabaeidae. It is found in Australia (Western Australia).

== Taxonomy ==
This species belongs to the alienus species group. The defining characters of this group include setae on the disc of the pronotum and the disc of the elytra.

== Description ==
Adults reach a length of about 5.5 mm (0.22 in). The head, pronotum and scutellum are dull black, while the elytra are pale yellowish brown or black margins. The abdomen and ventral surface are brown or black, the legs reddish brown and the antennae are reddish brown with a dark brown club.
