= Liparetrus aulax =

Scientific classification
- Kingdom: Animalia
- Phylum: Arthropoda
- Clade: Pancrustacea
- Class: Insecta
- Order: Coleoptera
- Suborder: Polyphaga
- Infraorder: Scarabaeiformia
- Family: Scarabaeidae
- Genus: Liparetrus
- Species: L. aulax

Binomial name
- Liparetrus aulax Britton, 1980

Species of beetle

Liparetrus aulax is a species of beetle of the family Scarabaeidae. It is found in Australia (Northern Territory).

== Taxonomy ==
This species belongs to the gracilipes species group. The defining characters of this group include the absence of setae on the discs of the pronotum and elytra, while the pronotum is either without setae on the anterior margin or with only a few setae on each side.

== Description ==
Adults reach a length of about 5 mm (0.20 in). The head, pronotum, ventral surface and base of the abdomen are black or dark brown, while the elytra are light yellowish brown with darkened margins. The pygidium and propygidium are reddish yellow and the antennae are yellow with a dark brown club.
