= Liparetrus cantrelli =

Scientific classification
- Kingdom: Animalia
- Phylum: Arthropoda
- Clade: Pancrustacea
- Class: Insecta
- Order: Coleoptera
- Suborder: Polyphaga
- Infraorder: Scarabaeiformia
- Family: Scarabaeidae
- Genus: Liparetrus
- Species: L. cantrelli

Binomial name
- Liparetrus cantrelli Britton, 1980

Species of beetle

Liparetrus cantrelli is a species of beetle of the family Scarabaeidae. It is found in Australia (Northern Territory).

== Taxonomy ==
This species belongs to the lanaticollis species group. The defining characters of this group include the absence of setae on the disc of the elytra, Furthermore, the base and apex of the elytra are usually darker than the disc.

== Description ==
Adults reach a length of about 5.7–6.2 mm (0.22–0.24 in). The clypeus of the males is reddish yellow, while in females, the base is black. The frons and pronotum are shining black, while sometimes the pronotum is yellowish brown. The elytra are pale yellowish brown on the disc with dark brown or black margins. The abdomen is dark brown or black, with the propygidium and pygidium pale reddish yellow in the middle.
