= Liparetrus nudipennis =

Scientific classification
- Kingdom: Animalia
- Phylum: Arthropoda
- Clade: Pancrustacea
- Class: Insecta
- Order: Coleoptera
- Suborder: Polyphaga
- Infraorder: Scarabaeiformia
- Family: Scarabaeidae
- Genus: Liparetrus
- Species: L. nudipennis

Binomial name
- Liparetrus nudipennis Germar, 1848

Species of beetle

Liparetrus nudipennis is a species of beetle of the family Scarabaeidae. It is found in Australia (South Australia, Victoria).

== Taxonomy ==
This species belongs to the nudipennis species group. The defining characters of this group include the dense covering of scales on the pronotum and abdomen.

== Description ==
Adults reach a length of about 6 mm (0.24 in). The body and legs are black, the palpi dark brown and the antennae yellowish brown with a dark brown club.
