= Liparetrus micros =

Scientific classification
- Kingdom: Animalia
- Phylum: Arthropoda
- Clade: Pancrustacea
- Class: Insecta
- Order: Coleoptera
- Suborder: Polyphaga
- Infraorder: Scarabaeiformia
- Family: Scarabaeidae
- Genus: Liparetrus
- Species: L. micros

Binomial name
- Liparetrus micros Britton, 1980

Species of beetle

Liparetrus micros is a species of beetle of the family Scarabaeidae. It is found in Australia (Northern Territory).

== Taxonomy ==
This species belongs to the monticola species group.

== Description ==
Adults reach a length of about 3.5–4.25 mm (0.138–0.167 in). The body and legs are yellowish brown.
