= Liparetrus modestus =

Scientific classification
- Kingdom: Animalia
- Phylum: Arthropoda
- Clade: Pancrustacea
- Class: Insecta
- Order: Coleoptera
- Suborder: Polyphaga
- Infraorder: Scarabaeiformia
- Family: Scarabaeidae
- Genus: Liparetrus
- Species: L. modestus

Binomial name
- Liparetrus modestus Blackburn, 1888

Species of beetle

Liparetrus modestus is a species of beetle of the family Scarabaeidae. It is found in Australia.

== Taxonomy ==
This species belongs to the laetus species group.

== Description ==
Adults reach a length of about 4.5 mm (0.18 in). The head and pronotum are brown, while the elytra are reddish brown and the abdomen paler reddish brown. The legs and antennae are brown.
