= Liparetrus dixoni =

Scientific classification
- Kingdom: Animalia
- Phylum: Arthropoda
- Clade: Pancrustacea
- Class: Insecta
- Order: Coleoptera
- Suborder: Polyphaga
- Infraorder: Scarabaeiformia
- Family: Scarabaeidae
- Genus: Liparetrus
- Species: L. dixoni

Binomial name
- Liparetrus dixoni Britton, 1980

Species of beetle

Liparetrus dixoni is a species of beetle of the family Scarabaeidae. It is found in Australia (Victoria).

== Taxonomy ==
This species belongs to the dixoni species group. The defining characters of this group include the covering of broad scales on the clypeus, frons, pronotum and abdomen.

== Description ==
Adults reach a length of about 5.5 mm (0.22 in). The head, pronotum and abdomen are black and covered with yellowish white scales. The ventral surface is black, with whitish setae. The tarsi are reddish brown, while the rest of the legs are dark brown to black. The elytra are pale yellowish to reddish brown with the base and scutellum black.
