= Liparetrus pimbus =

Scientific classification
- Kingdom: Animalia
- Phylum: Arthropoda
- Clade: Pancrustacea
- Class: Insecta
- Order: Coleoptera
- Suborder: Polyphaga
- Infraorder: Scarabaeiformia
- Family: Scarabaeidae
- Genus: Liparetrus
- Species: L. pimbus

Binomial name
- Liparetrus pimbus Britton, 1980

Species of beetle

Liparetrus pimbus is a species of beetle of the family Scarabaeidae. It is found in Australia (Western Australia, Victoria).

== Taxonomy ==
This species belongs to the marginipennis species group. The defining characters of this group include the presence of setae on the disc of the pronotum. The elytra normally also have setae on the disc, but these may be absent, in which case there is at least a continuous fringe of setae on the anterior margin.

== Description ==
Adults reach a length of about 8 mm (0.31 in). They are similar to Liparetrus wypandus, but may be distinguished by the dark brown setae on the frons and the feathery, white setae on the abdomen.
