= Liparetrus kiatanus =

Scientific classification
- Kingdom: Animalia
- Phylum: Arthropoda
- Clade: Pancrustacea
- Class: Insecta
- Order: Coleoptera
- Suborder: Polyphaga
- Infraorder: Scarabaeiformia
- Family: Scarabaeidae
- Genus: Liparetrus
- Species: L. kiatanus

Binomial name
- Liparetrus kiatanus Britton, 1980

Species of beetle

Liparetrus kiatanus is a species of beetle of the family Scarabaeidae. It is found in Australia (Victoria).

== Taxonomy ==
This species belongs to the rufipennis species group. The defining characters of this group include the absence of setae and scales on the disc of the pronotum.

== Description ==
Adults reach a length of about 4.5–5 mm (0.18–0.20 in). The head, pronotum and ventral thorax are dark brown to black, while the elytra are pale yellowish brown.
