= Liparetrus uptoni =

Scientific classification
- Kingdom: Animalia
- Phylum: Arthropoda
- Clade: Pancrustacea
- Class: Insecta
- Order: Coleoptera
- Suborder: Polyphaga
- Infraorder: Scarabaeiformia
- Family: Scarabaeidae
- Genus: Liparetrus
- Species: L. uptoni

Binomial name
- Liparetrus uptoni Britton, 1980

Species of beetle

Liparetrus uptoni is a species of beetle of the family Scarabaeidae. It is found in Australia (Western Australia).

== Taxonomy ==
This species belongs to the lanaticollis species group. The defining characters of this group include the absence of setae on the disc of the elytra, Furthermore, the base and apex of the elytra are usually darker than the disc.

== Description ==
Adults reach a length of about 5–6 mm (0.20–0.24 in). The head is black and the pronotum is very dark reddish brown. The elytra are yellowish brown with pale yellow apical margins.
