= Liparetrus paryphus =

Scientific classification
- Kingdom: Animalia
- Phylum: Arthropoda
- Clade: Pancrustacea
- Class: Insecta
- Order: Coleoptera
- Suborder: Polyphaga
- Infraorder: Scarabaeiformia
- Family: Scarabaeidae
- Genus: Liparetrus
- Species: L. paryphus

Binomial name
- Liparetrus paryphus Britton, 1980

Species of beetle

Liparetrus paryphus is a species of beetle of the family Scarabaeidae. It is found in Australia (Western Australia).

== Taxonomy ==
This species belongs to the marginipennis species group. The defining characters of this group include the presence of setae on the disc of the pronotum. The elytra normally also have setae on the disc, but these may be absent, in which case there is at least a continuous fringe of setae on the anterior margin.

== Description ==
Adults reach a length of about 10 mm (0.39 in). The head, pronotum, scutellum and ventral thorax are black, while the elytra, abdomen, antennae and legs are reddish brown.
