= Liparetrus hirpex =

Scientific classification
- Kingdom: Animalia
- Phylum: Arthropoda
- Clade: Pancrustacea
- Class: Insecta
- Order: Coleoptera
- Suborder: Polyphaga
- Infraorder: Scarabaeiformia
- Family: Scarabaeidae
- Genus: Liparetrus
- Species: L. hirpex

Binomial name
- Liparetrus hirpex Britton, 1980

Species of beetle

Liparetrus hirpex is a species of beetle of the family Scarabaeidae. It is found in Australia (Queensland).

== Taxonomy ==
This species belongs to the atratus species group. The defining characters of this group include the absence of scales on the clypeus, frons, pronotum and abdomen.

== Description ==
Adults reach a length of about 6.5 mm (0.26 in). The head and pronotum are black, while the elytra are reddish yellow with a black base. The ventral surface and abdomen are dark reddish brown, the legs reddish brown and the antennae yellowish brown with a darkened club.
