= Liparetrus argenteus =

Scientific classification
- Kingdom: Animalia
- Phylum: Arthropoda
- Clade: Pancrustacea
- Class: Insecta
- Order: Coleoptera
- Suborder: Polyphaga
- Infraorder: Scarabaeiformia
- Family: Scarabaeidae
- Genus: Liparetrus
- Species: L. argenteus

Binomial name
- Liparetrus argenteus Britton, 1980

Species of beetle

Liparetrus argenteus is a species of beetle of the family Scarabaeidae. It is found in Australia (Queensland).

== Taxonomy ==
This species belongs to the convexior species group. The defining characters of this group include the absence of setae and scales on the disc of the pronotum.

== Description ==
Adults reach a length of about 6 mm (0.24 in). The clypeus is shining and black or red anteriorly and black at the base. The frons is black and the pronotum is bright reddish yellow with a black posterior margin. The elytra and abdomen are yellowish brown.
