= Liparetrus concolor =

Scientific classification
- Kingdom: Animalia
- Phylum: Arthropoda
- Clade: Pancrustacea
- Class: Insecta
- Order: Coleoptera
- Suborder: Polyphaga
- Infraorder: Scarabaeiformia
- Family: Scarabaeidae
- Genus: Liparetrus
- Species: L. concolor

Binomial name
- Liparetrus concolor Erichson, 1842

Species of beetle

Liparetrus concolor is a species of beetle of the family Scarabaeidae. It is found in Australia (Tasmania, New South Wales, Victoria, South Australia).

== Taxonomy ==
This species belongs to the concolor species group. The defining characters of this group include the absence of setae on the discs of the pronotum and elytra, while the pronotum has a fringe of setae along the anterior margin.

== Description ==
Adults reach a length of about 6.5–9 mm (0.26–0.35 in). The body is black, with iridescent elytra. The legs are dark brown with reddish tarsi.
