= Liparetrus dispar =

Scientific classification
- Kingdom: Animalia
- Phylum: Arthropoda
- Clade: Pancrustacea
- Class: Insecta
- Order: Coleoptera
- Suborder: Polyphaga
- Infraorder: Scarabaeiformia
- Family: Scarabaeidae
- Genus: Liparetrus
- Species: L. dispar

Binomial name
- Liparetrus dispar Blackburn, 1888

Species of beetle

Liparetrus dispar is a species of beetle of the family Scarabaeidae. It is found in Australia (Victoria).

== Taxonomy ==
This species belongs to the erythropterus species group. The defining characters of this group include the presence of setae on the disc of the pronotum, while these are absent on the disc of the elytra.

== Description ==
Adults reach a length of about 8.5 mm (0.33 in). They are black, but the elytra are reddish brown with black margins.
