= Liparetrus vastus =

Scientific classification
- Kingdom: Animalia
- Phylum: Arthropoda
- Clade: Pancrustacea
- Class: Insecta
- Order: Coleoptera
- Suborder: Polyphaga
- Infraorder: Scarabaeiformia
- Family: Scarabaeidae
- Genus: Liparetrus
- Species: L. vastus

Binomial name
- Liparetrus vastus Britton, 1980

Species of beetle

Liparetrus vastus is a species of beetle of the family Scarabaeidae. It is found in Australia (Northern Territory).

== Taxonomy ==
This species belongs to the fulvohirtus species group. The defining characters of this group include the presence of setae on the discs of the pronotum and elytra.

== Description ==
Adults reach a length of about 10.5 mm (0.41 in). They have a black body with pale, whitish setae. The legs are bright reddish brown and the antennae are yellowish brown with a black club.
