= Liparetrus occidentalis =

Scientific classification
- Kingdom: Animalia
- Phylum: Arthropoda
- Clade: Pancrustacea
- Class: Insecta
- Order: Coleoptera
- Suborder: Polyphaga
- Infraorder: Scarabaeiformia
- Family: Scarabaeidae
- Genus: Liparetrus
- Species: L. occidentalis

Binomial name
- Liparetrus occidentalis MacLeay, 1886

Species of beetle

Liparetrus occidentalis is a species of beetle of the family Scarabaeidae. It is found in Australia (Western Australia).

== Taxonomy ==
This species belongs to the lanaticollis species group. The defining characters of this group include the absence of setae on the disc of the elytra, Furthermore, the base and apex of the elytra are usually darker than the disc.

== Description ==
Adults reach a length of about 7 mm (0.28 in). The body is black or very dark brown, except for the pale yellowish brown disc of the elytra and the reddish brown legs. The margins of the elytra are dark brown.
