= Liparetrus xanthotrichus =

Scientific classification
- Kingdom: Animalia
- Phylum: Arthropoda
- Clade: Pancrustacea
- Class: Insecta
- Order: Coleoptera
- Suborder: Polyphaga
- Infraorder: Scarabaeiformia
- Family: Scarabaeidae
- Genus: Liparetrus
- Species: L. xanthotrichus

Binomial name
- Liparetrus xanthotrichus Blanchard, 1850

Species of beetle

Liparetrus xanthotrichus is a species of beetle of the family Scarabaeidae. It is found in Australia (New South Wales).

== Taxonomy ==
This species belongs to the marginipennis species group. The defining characters of this group include the presence of setae on the disc of the pronotum. The elytra normally also have setae on the disc, but these may be absent, in which case there is at least a continuous fringe of setae on the anterior margin.

== Description ==
Adults reach a length of about 8–10 mm (0.31–0.39 in). The head, pronotum, abdomen and ventral surface are black, while the elytra are reddish yellow with black basal and lateral margins. The antennae are yellowish with a black club.
