= Liparetrus vespertinus =

Scientific classification
- Kingdom: Animalia
- Phylum: Arthropoda
- Clade: Pancrustacea
- Class: Insecta
- Order: Coleoptera
- Suborder: Polyphaga
- Infraorder: Scarabaeiformia
- Family: Scarabaeidae
- Genus: Liparetrus
- Species: L. vespertinus

Binomial name
- Liparetrus vespertinus Britton, 1980

Species of beetle

Liparetrus vespertinus is a species of beetle of the family Scarabaeidae. It is found in Australia (Western Australia).

== Taxonomy ==
This species belongs to the gracilipes species group. The defining characters of this group include the absence of setae on the discs of the pronotum and elytra, while the pronotum is either without setae on the anterior margin or with only a few setae on each side.

== Description ==
Adults reach a length of about 7.5 mm (0.30 in). The head and pronotum are black, while the elytra are reddish brown with a darkened base. The abdomen, ventral surface and legs are dark brown.
