= Liparetrus furfurosus =

Scientific classification
- Kingdom: Animalia
- Phylum: Arthropoda
- Clade: Pancrustacea
- Class: Insecta
- Order: Coleoptera
- Suborder: Polyphaga
- Infraorder: Scarabaeiformia
- Family: Scarabaeidae
- Genus: Liparetrus
- Species: L. furfurosus

Binomial name
- Liparetrus furfurosus Britton, 1980

Species of beetle

Liparetrus furfurosus is a species of beetle of the family Scarabaeidae. It is found in Australia (Northern Territory).

== Taxonomy ==
This species belongs to the flavus species group. The defining characters of this group include the absence of obvious setae on the disc of the pronotum, the glabrous or setate (but without scales) propygidium and pygidium, the elongate elytra and the pale yellowish brown colour of the body.

== Description ==
Adults reach a length of about 6.7–8.5 mm (0.26–0.33 in). The head is dark reddish brown and the pronotum is yellowish brown with the anterior and posterior margins dark brown. The pronotum and elytra are moderately shining.
