= Liparetrus albipennis =

Scientific classification
- Kingdom: Animalia
- Phylum: Arthropoda
- Clade: Pancrustacea
- Class: Insecta
- Order: Coleoptera
- Suborder: Polyphaga
- Infraorder: Scarabaeiformia
- Family: Scarabaeidae
- Genus: Liparetrus
- Species: L. albipennis

Binomial name
- Liparetrus albipennis Britton, 1980

Species of beetle

Liparetrus albipennis is a species of beetle of the family Scarabaeidae. It is found in Australia (Western Australia).

== Taxonomy ==
This species belongs to the laetus species group.

== Description ==
Adults reach a length of about 5.5 mm (0.22 in). The head and pronotum are black, while the elytra are reddish brown with darkened to black margins. The antennae are yellowish brown and the legs are reddish.
