= Liparetrus squamiger =

Scientific classification
- Kingdom: Animalia
- Phylum: Arthropoda
- Clade: Pancrustacea
- Class: Insecta
- Order: Coleoptera
- Suborder: Polyphaga
- Infraorder: Scarabaeiformia
- Family: Scarabaeidae
- Genus: Liparetrus
- Species: L. squamiger

Binomial name
- Liparetrus squamiger MacLeay, 1886

Species of beetle

Liparetrus squamiger is a species of beetle of the family Scarabaeidae. It is found in Australia (South Australia).

== Taxonomy ==
This species belongs to the squamiger species group. The defining characters of this group include the presence of setae on the disc of the pronotum.

== Description ==
Adults reach a length of about 4.25–5 mm (0.167–0.197 in). The clypeus is reddish or black and the frons is black. The pronotum is also black and the elytra are black in males, but reddish yellow in females. The abdomen is dark brown or black.
