= Liparetrus karinus =

Scientific classification
- Kingdom: Animalia
- Phylum: Arthropoda
- Clade: Pancrustacea
- Class: Insecta
- Order: Coleoptera
- Suborder: Polyphaga
- Infraorder: Scarabaeiformia
- Family: Scarabaeidae
- Genus: Liparetrus
- Species: L. karinus

Binomial name
- Liparetrus karinus Britton, 1980

Species of beetle

Liparetrus karinus is a species of beetle of the family Scarabaeidae. It is found in Australia (Western Australia).

== Taxonomy ==
This species belongs to the concolor species group. The defining characters of this group include the absence of setae on the discs of the pronotum and elytra, while the pronotum has a fringe of setae along the anterior margin.

== Description ==
Adults reach a length of about 8–9 mm (0.31–0.35 in). The body is black, with iridescent elytra. The legs are dark reddish brown.
