= Liparetrus brevipes =

Scientific classification
- Kingdom: Animalia
- Phylum: Arthropoda
- Clade: Pancrustacea
- Class: Insecta
- Order: Coleoptera
- Suborder: Polyphaga
- Infraorder: Scarabaeiformia
- Family: Scarabaeidae
- Genus: Liparetrus
- Species: L. brevipes

Binomial name
- Liparetrus brevipes Blackburn, 1905

Synonyms
- Liparetrus leai Blackburn, 1905

Species of beetle

Liparetrus brevipes is a species of beetle of the family Scarabaeidae. It is found in Australia (Western Australia).

== Taxonomy ==
This species belongs to the striatus species group. The defining characters of this group include the absence of setae on the disc of the pronotum and scales or flattened, adpressed setae on the propygidium and usually also the pygidium.

== Description ==
Adults reach a length of about 6 mm (0.24 in). Males have a black head, pronotum, scutellum, abdomen and ventral surface, pale brownish yellow elytra with darkened margins and dark brown legs. In females, the head is dark reddish brown, the pronotum reddish yellow with black anterior and posterior edges. The elytra, abdomen and ventral surface are pale brownish yellow and the legs are reddish yellow.
