= Liparetrus castaneus =

Scientific classification
- Kingdom: Animalia
- Phylum: Arthropoda
- Clade: Pancrustacea
- Class: Insecta
- Order: Coleoptera
- Suborder: Polyphaga
- Infraorder: Scarabaeiformia
- Family: Scarabaeidae
- Genus: Liparetrus
- Species: L. castaneus

Binomial name
- Liparetrus castaneus Britton, 1980

Species of beetle

Liparetrus castaneus is a species of beetle of the family Scarabaeidae. It is found in Australia (Northern Territory, Western Australia).

== Taxonomy ==
This species belongs to the lanaticollis species group. The defining characters of this group include the absence of setae on the disc of the elytra, Furthermore, the base and apex of the elytra are usually darker than the disc.

== Description ==
Adults reach a length of about 5.5–8 mm (0.22–0.31 in). The head is reddish brown, while the rest of the body is yellowish brown.
