= Liparetrus commoni =

Scientific classification
- Kingdom: Animalia
- Phylum: Arthropoda
- Clade: Pancrustacea
- Class: Insecta
- Order: Coleoptera
- Suborder: Polyphaga
- Infraorder: Scarabaeiformia
- Family: Scarabaeidae
- Genus: Liparetrus
- Species: L. commoni

Binomial name
- Liparetrus commoni Britton, 1980

Species of beetle

Liparetrus commoni is a species of beetle of the family Scarabaeidae. It is found in Australia (Western Australia).

== Taxonomy ==
This species belongs to the lanaticollis species group. The defining characters of this group include the absence of setae on the disc of the elytra, Furthermore, the base and apex of the elytra are usually darker than the disc.

== Description ==
Adults reach a length of about 5.2–6.9 mm (0.20–0.27 in). The head is reddish brown, while the rest of the body is paler reddish brown. The legs are dark reddish brown.
