= Liparetrus periosus =

Scientific classification
- Kingdom: Animalia
- Phylum: Arthropoda
- Clade: Pancrustacea
- Class: Insecta
- Order: Coleoptera
- Suborder: Polyphaga
- Infraorder: Scarabaeiformia
- Family: Scarabaeidae
- Genus: Liparetrus
- Species: L. periosus

Binomial name
- Liparetrus periosus Britton, 1980

Species of beetle

Liparetrus periosus is a species of beetle of the family Scarabaeidae. It is found in Australia (Western Australia).

== Taxonomy ==
This species belongs to the rufipennis species group. The defining characters of this group include the absence of setae and scales on the disc of the pronotum.

== Description ==
Adults reach a length of about 11–14 mm (0.43–0.55 in). The head and pronotum are black, while the elytra, abdomen and ventral surface are dark brown to black. The antennae are reddish brown with a black club. Some legs are reddish brown, while others are dark brown.
