= Liparetrus mimus =

Scientific classification
- Kingdom: Animalia
- Phylum: Arthropoda
- Clade: Pancrustacea
- Class: Insecta
- Order: Coleoptera
- Suborder: Polyphaga
- Infraorder: Scarabaeiformia
- Family: Scarabaeidae
- Genus: Liparetrus
- Species: L. mimus

Binomial name
- Liparetrus mimus Britton, 1980

Species of beetle

Liparetrus mimus is a species of beetle of the family Scarabaeidae. It is found in Australia (South Australia, Western Australia, Northern Territory).

== Taxonomy ==
This species belongs to the gracilipes species group. The defining characters of this group include the absence of setae on the discs of the pronotum and elytra, while the pronotum is either without setae on the anterior margin or with only a few setae on each side.

== Description ==
Adults reach a length of about 6.5–9 mm (0.26–0.35 in). The body is bright reddish yellow, with the frons sometimes darker than the clypeus and pronotum.
