= Liparetrus lugens =

Scientific classification
- Kingdom: Animalia
- Phylum: Arthropoda
- Clade: Pancrustacea
- Class: Insecta
- Order: Coleoptera
- Suborder: Polyphaga
- Infraorder: Scarabaeiformia
- Family: Scarabaeidae
- Genus: Liparetrus
- Species: L. lugens

Binomial name
- Liparetrus lugens Blackburn, 1892

Synonyms
- Liparetrus tarsalis Lea, 1924

Species of beetle

Liparetrus lugens is a species of beetle of the family Scarabaeidae. It is found in Australia (Australian Capital Territory, New South Wales, Victoria).

== Taxonomy ==
This species belongs to the concolor species group. The defining characters of this group include the absence of setae on the discs of the pronotum and elytra, while the pronotum has a fringe of setae along the anterior margin.

== Description ==
Adults reach a length of about 8–9 mm (0.31–0.35 in). The head is black, while the remainder of the body is either black or dark brown. Sometimes, the disc of the elytra is reddish.
