= Liparetrus albohirtus =

Scientific classification
- Kingdom: Animalia
- Phylum: Arthropoda
- Clade: Pancrustacea
- Class: Insecta
- Order: Coleoptera
- Suborder: Polyphaga
- Infraorder: Scarabaeiformia
- Family: Scarabaeidae
- Genus: Liparetrus
- Species: L. albohirtus

Binomial name
- Liparetrus albohirtus Masters, 1886

Synonyms
- Liparetrus basalis MacLeay, 1864

Species of beetle

Liparetrus albohirtus is a species of beetle of the family Scarabaeidae. It is found in Australia (Queensland).

== Taxonomy ==
This species belongs to the discipennis species group. The defining characters of this group include the presence of long setae on the disc of the elytra (at least towards the base).

== Description ==
Adults reach a length of about 7 mm (0.28 in). The head, pronotum and ventral thorax are black, while the elytra are yellowish brown with a black base and a pale yellow apical margin. The abdomen is black and the propygidium and pygidium are mostly pale reddish yellow. The antennae and most of the legs are yellowish brown.
