= Liparetrus erythropterus =

Scientific classification
- Kingdom: Animalia
- Phylum: Arthropoda
- Clade: Pancrustacea
- Class: Insecta
- Order: Coleoptera
- Suborder: Polyphaga
- Infraorder: Scarabaeiformia
- Family: Scarabaeidae
- Genus: Liparetrus
- Species: L. erythropterus

Binomial name
- Liparetrus erythropterus Blanchard, 1850

Species of beetle

Liparetrus erythropterus is a species of beetle of the family Scarabaeidae. It is found in Australia (New South Wales).

== Taxonomy ==
This species belongs to the erythropterus species group. The defining characters of this group include the presence of setae on the disc of the pronotum, while these are absent on the disc of the elytra.

== Description ==
Adults reach a length of about 10 mm (0.39 in). The head, pronotum, abdomen and ventral surface are black, while the elytra are reddish brown. The legs are dark brown and the antennae yellowish brown with a brown club.
