= Liparetrus minimus =

Scientific classification
- Kingdom: Animalia
- Phylum: Arthropoda
- Clade: Pancrustacea
- Class: Insecta
- Order: Coleoptera
- Suborder: Polyphaga
- Infraorder: Scarabaeiformia
- Family: Scarabaeidae
- Genus: Liparetrus
- Species: L. minimus

Binomial name
- Liparetrus minimus Britton, 1980

Species of beetle

Liparetrus minimus is a species of beetle of the family Scarabaeidae. It is found in Australia (Northern Territory, Western Australia).

== Taxonomy ==
This species belongs to the lanaticollis species group. The defining characters of this group include the absence of setae on the disc of the elytra, Furthermore, the base and apex of the elytra are usually darker than the disc.

== Description ==
Adults reach a length of about 5–6 mm (0.20–0.24 in). The head and legs are pale reddish brown, while the rest of the body is pale yellowish brown.
