= Liparetrus aridus =

Scientific classification
- Kingdom: Animalia
- Phylum: Arthropoda
- Clade: Pancrustacea
- Class: Insecta
- Order: Coleoptera
- Suborder: Polyphaga
- Infraorder: Scarabaeiformia
- Family: Scarabaeidae
- Genus: Liparetrus
- Species: L. aridus

Binomial name
- Liparetrus aridus Blackburn, 1895

Species of beetle

Liparetrus aridus is a species of beetle of the family Scarabaeidae. It is found in Australia (Western Australia, South Australia).

== Taxonomy ==
This species belongs to the flavus species group. The defining characters of this group include the absence of obvious setae on the disc of the pronotum, the glabrous or setate (but without scales) propygidium and pygidium, the elongate elytra and the pale yellowish brown colour of the body.

== Description ==
Adults reach a length of about 5.5–7.5 mm (0.22–0.30 in). The pronotum is without setae, except within the anterior angles and along the lateral edges and the anterior margin. Part of the margins of the elytra bear short, yellow setae and the pygidium is sparsely covered with short, yellow setae.
