= Liparetrus rubefactus =

Scientific classification
- Kingdom: Animalia
- Phylum: Arthropoda
- Clade: Pancrustacea
- Class: Insecta
- Order: Coleoptera
- Suborder: Polyphaga
- Infraorder: Scarabaeiformia
- Family: Scarabaeidae
- Genus: Liparetrus
- Species: L. rubefactus

Binomial name
- Liparetrus rubefactus MacLeay, 1886

Species of beetle

Liparetrus rubefactus is a species of beetle of the family Scarabaeidae. It is found in Australia (Western Australia).

== Taxonomy ==
This species belongs to the concolor species group. The defining characters of this group include the absence of setae on the discs of the pronotum and elytra, while the pronotum has a fringe of setae along the anterior margin.

== Description ==
Adults reach a length of about 6–7.5 mm (0.24–0.30 in). The head and pronotum are black and the elytra, abdomen and ventral surface are bright reddish brown in females, but black in males. The legs are reddish brown to black.
