= Liparetrus newmani =

Scientific classification
- Kingdom: Animalia
- Phylum: Arthropoda
- Clade: Pancrustacea
- Class: Insecta
- Order: Coleoptera
- Suborder: Polyphaga
- Infraorder: Scarabaeiformia
- Family: Scarabaeidae
- Genus: Liparetrus
- Species: L. newmani

Binomial name
- Liparetrus newmani Britton, 1980

Species of beetle

Liparetrus newmani is a species of beetle of the family Scarabaeidae. It is found in Australia (Western Australia).

== Taxonomy ==
This species belongs to the convexior species group. The defining characters of this group include the absence of setae and scales on the disc of the pronotum.

== Description ==
Adults reach a length of about 9 mm (0.35 in). The head, pronotum, scutellum and ventral surface are all black in males. In females, the frons is black, the clypeus reddish anteriorly and black posteriorly, the pronotum dark reddish brown and the scutellum black. The elytra, abdomen and legs are the same for both sexes: reddish brown. Females have a dark reddish brown ventral surface. The antennae are reddish brown with a black club in males. The club of the females is partly yellow and partly dark brown.
