= Liparetrus puer =

Scientific classification
- Kingdom: Animalia
- Phylum: Arthropoda
- Clade: Pancrustacea
- Class: Insecta
- Order: Coleoptera
- Suborder: Polyphaga
- Infraorder: Scarabaeiformia
- Family: Scarabaeidae
- Genus: Liparetrus
- Species: L. puer

Binomial name
- Liparetrus puer Blackburn, 1905

Synonyms
- Liparetrus longipilis Lea, 1924

Species of beetle

Liparetrus puer is a species of beetle of the family Scarabaeidae. It is found in Australia (Western Australia, South Australia, Victoria).

== Taxonomy ==
This species belongs to the erythropterus species group. The defining characters of this group include the presence of setae on the disc of the pronotum, while these are absent on the disc of the elytra.

== Description ==
Adults reach a length of about 4.5–6.2 mm (0.18–0.24 in). The frons and pronotum are brown to dark brown, while the clypeus and elytra are reddish brown, the latter darker at the base. The abdomen, ventral surface and legs are black in males, but yellowish brown in females. The antennae are yellow, usually with a black club.
