= Liparetrus merus =

Scientific classification
- Kingdom: Animalia
- Phylum: Arthropoda
- Clade: Pancrustacea
- Class: Insecta
- Order: Coleoptera
- Suborder: Polyphaga
- Infraorder: Scarabaeiformia
- Family: Scarabaeidae
- Genus: Liparetrus
- Species: L. merus

Binomial name
- Liparetrus merus Britton, 1980

Species of beetle

Liparetrus merus is a species of beetle of the family Scarabaeidae. It is found in Australia (New South Wales).

== Taxonomy ==
This species belongs to the rufipennis species group. The defining characters of this group include the absence of setae and scales on the disc of the pronotum.

== Description ==
Adults reach a length of about 5.5 mm (0.22 in). The head and pronotum are black, while the elytra are pale yellowish brown with a black basal area. The abdomen is pale reddish brown, the ventral thorax is dark brown and the legs are yellowish to reddish brown.
