= Liparetrus assitus =

Scientific classification
- Kingdom: Animalia
- Phylum: Arthropoda
- Clade: Pancrustacea
- Class: Insecta
- Order: Coleoptera
- Suborder: Polyphaga
- Infraorder: Scarabaeiformia
- Family: Scarabaeidae
- Genus: Liparetrus
- Species: L. assitus

Binomial name
- Liparetrus assitus Britton, 1980

Species of beetle

Liparetrus assitus is a species of beetle of the family Scarabaeidae. It is found in Australia (Western Australia).

== Taxonomy ==
This species belongs to the flavus species group. The defining characters of this group include the absence of obvious setae on the disc of the pronotum, the glabrous or setate (but without scales) propygidium and pygidium, the elongate elytra and the pale yellowish brown colour of the body.

== Description ==
Adults reach a length of about 6–7.2 mm (0.24–0.28 in). The pronotum has a pale anterior margin and a fringe of fine setae, which become longer towards the sides. The narrow intervals and lateral and apical declivities on the elytra have some short setae.
