= Liparetrus minutus =

Scientific classification
- Kingdom: Animalia
- Phylum: Arthropoda
- Clade: Pancrustacea
- Class: Insecta
- Order: Coleoptera
- Suborder: Polyphaga
- Infraorder: Scarabaeiformia
- Family: Scarabaeidae
- Genus: Liparetrus
- Species: L. minutus

Binomial name
- Liparetrus minutus Britton, 1980

Species of beetle

Liparetrus minutus is a species of beetle of the family Scarabaeidae. It is found in Australia (Western Australia).

== Taxonomy ==
This species belongs to the lanaticollis species group. The defining characters of this group include the absence of setae on the disc of the elytra, Furthermore, the base and apex of the elytra are usually darker than the disc.

== Description ==
Adults reach a length of about 3.75 mm (0.148 in). The head is black and the pronotum is dark brown to black. The scutellum is black with yellow edges and the elytra are pale yellowish brown with a black basal area and pale yellow apical margins. The abdomen is dark brown to black and the legs are reddish brown. The antennae are reddish with a black club.
