= Liparetrus armstrongi =

Scientific classification
- Kingdom: Animalia
- Phylum: Arthropoda
- Clade: Pancrustacea
- Class: Insecta
- Order: Coleoptera
- Suborder: Polyphaga
- Infraorder: Scarabaeiformia
- Family: Scarabaeidae
- Genus: Liparetrus
- Species: L. armstrongi

Binomial name
- Liparetrus armstrongi Britton, 1980

Species of beetle

Liparetrus armstrongi is a species of beetle of the family Scarabaeidae. It is found in Australia (New South Wales).

== Taxonomy ==
This species belongs to the dixoni species group. The defining characters of this group include the covering of broad scales on the clypeus, frons, pronotum and abdomen.

== Description ==
Adults reach a length of about 6 mm (0.24 in). The head is black and the pronotum and ventral thorax are dark brown to black. The elytra are reddish yellow with a black basal area and the abdomen is pale reddish yellow. The legs are reddish brown.
