= Liparetrus tenebrosus =

Scientific classification
- Kingdom: Animalia
- Phylum: Arthropoda
- Clade: Pancrustacea
- Class: Insecta
- Order: Coleoptera
- Suborder: Polyphaga
- Infraorder: Scarabaeiformia
- Family: Scarabaeidae
- Genus: Liparetrus
- Species: L. tenebrosus

Binomial name
- Liparetrus tenebrosus Britton, 1980

Species of beetle

Liparetrus tenebrosus is a species of beetle of the family Scarabaeidae. It is found in Australia (Victoria, South Australia, Western Australia).

== Taxonomy ==
This species belongs to the gracilipes species group. The defining characters of this group include the absence of setae on the discs of the pronotum and elytra, while the pronotum is either without setae on the anterior margin or with only a few setae on each side.

== Description ==
Adults reach a length of about 7 mm (0.28 in). The head and pronotum are black, while the elytra and abdomen are very dark brown or black.
