= Liparetrus monartus =

Scientific classification
- Kingdom: Animalia
- Phylum: Arthropoda
- Clade: Pancrustacea
- Class: Insecta
- Order: Coleoptera
- Suborder: Polyphaga
- Infraorder: Scarabaeiformia
- Family: Scarabaeidae
- Genus: Liparetrus
- Species: L. monartus

Binomial name
- Liparetrus monartus Britton, 1980

Species of beetle

Liparetrus monartus is a species of beetle of the family Scarabaeidae. It is found in Australia (Victoria).

== Taxonomy ==
This species belongs to the atratus species group. The defining characters of this group include the absence of scales on the clypeus, frons, pronotum and abdomen.

== Description ==
Adults reach a length of about 6.5 mm (0.26 in). The head, pronotum, ventral thorax and base of the abdomen are black, while the elytra are bright reddish brown with darkened margins. The biggest part of the abdomen is bright reddish yellow and the legs are mostly dark reddish brown.
