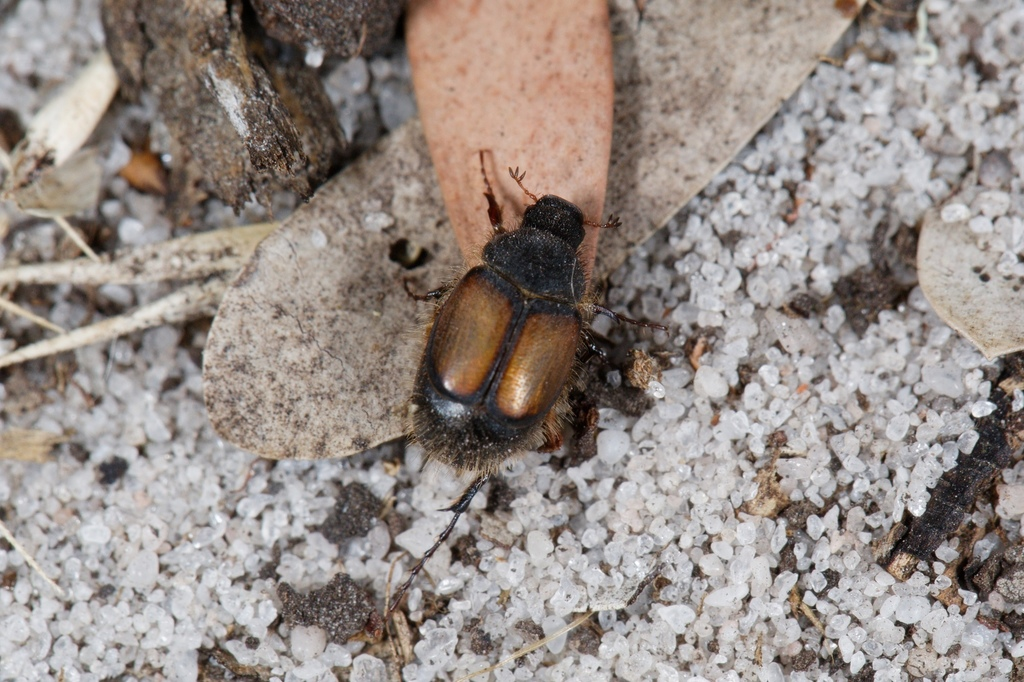
- Liparetrus discipennis

Scientific classification
- Kingdom: Animalia
- Phylum: Arthropoda
- Clade: Pancrustacea
- Class: Insecta
- Order: Coleoptera
- Suborder: Polyphaga
- Infraorder: Scarabaeiformia
- Family: Scarabaeidae
- Subfamily: Sericoidinae
- Tribe: Liparetrini
- Genus: Liparetrus; Guérin-Méneville, 1830

Synonyms
- Liparetra Hope, 1837

= Liparetrus =

Genus of beetles

Liparetrus is a genus of beetles belonging to the family Scarabaeidae.

== Species ==
- Liparetrus abnormalis MacLeay, 1886
- Liparetrus adelus Britton, 1980
- Liparetrus aethiops Britton, 1980
- Liparetrus albipennis Britton, 1980
- Liparetrus albohirtus Masters, 1886
- Liparetrus albosetosus Britton, 1980
- Liparetrus alienus Blackburn, 1905
- Liparetrus amabilis Blackburn, 1905
- Liparetrus amplus Britton, 1980
- Liparetrus analis Blackburn, 1888
- Liparetrus andersoni Britton, 1980
- Liparetrus angulatus MacLeay, 1886
- Liparetrus arenosus Britton, 1980
- Liparetrus argenteus Britton, 1980
- Liparetrus aridus Blackburn, 1895
- Liparetrus armstrongi Britton, 1980
- Liparetrus ascius Britton, 1980
- Liparetrus asper MacLeay, 1886
- Liparetrus assitus Britton, 1980
- Liparetrus ater MacLeay, 1886
- Liparetrus atomus Britton, 1959
- Liparetrus atratus Burmeister, 1855
- Liparetrus atriceps MacLeay, 1864
- Liparetrus atrox Britton, 1980
- Liparetrus aulax Britton, 1980
- Liparetrus badius MacLeay, 1888
- Liparetrus bakeri Britton, 1980
- Liparetrus bellarus Britton, 1980
- Liparetrus bimaculatus Lea, 1917
- Liparetrus bituberculatus MacLeay, 1886
- Liparetrus brevipes Blackburn, 1905
- Liparetrus cantrelli Britton, 1980
- Liparetrus capillatus MacLeay, 1886
- Liparetrus carnabyi Britton, 1980
- Liparetrus carnei Britton, 1980
- Liparetrus carpentariae Britton, 1980
- Liparetrus castaneus Britton, 1980
- Liparetrus cerinus Britton, 1980
- Liparetrus cinctipennis Blackburn, 1905
- Liparetrus cinnameus Britton, 1980
- Liparetrus cognatus Britton, 1980
- Liparetrus collaris MacLeay, 1886
- Liparetrus collessi Britton, 1980
- Liparetrus comes Britton, 1980
- Liparetrus commoni Britton, 1980
- Liparetrus compositus Lea, 1917
- Liparetrus concolor Erichson, 1842
- Liparetrus confusus Blackburn, 1912
- Liparetrus consanguineus Blackburn, 1905
- Liparetrus convexior MacLeay, 1886
- Liparetrus convexiusculus MacLeay, 1883
- Liparetrus convexus Boisduval, 1835
- Liparetrus crassus Britton, 1980
- Liparetrus cribriceps Lea, 1924
- Liparetrus cribripennis Lea, 1924
- Liparetrus criniger MacLeay, 1886
- Liparetrus curtulus Burmeister, 1855
- Liparetrus demarzi Britton, 1959
- Liparetrus discipennis Guérin-Méneville, 1830
- Liparetrus discoidalis MacLeay, 1864
- Liparetrus dispar Blackburn, 1888
- Liparetrus distans Blackburn, 1905
- Liparetrus distinctus Blackburn, 1895
- Liparetrus diversus Blackburn, 1888
- Liparetrus dixoni Britton, 1980
- Liparetrus ebeninus MacLeay, 1886
- Liparetrus erythropterus Blanchard, 1850
- Liparetrus erythropygus Blanchard, 1850
- Liparetrus ferrugineus Blanchard, 1850
- Liparetrus fimbriatus Blackburn, 1888
- Liparetrus finitimus Britton, 1980
- Liparetrus flavicornis Lea, 1917
- Liparetrus flavidus Britton, 1980
- Liparetrus flavipennis Lea, 1917
- Liparetrus flavopictus Britton, 1980
- Liparetrus flavus Lea, 1917
- Liparetrus fulvohirtus MacLeay, 1871
- Liparetrus fumosus Britton, 1980
- Liparetrus furfurosus Britton, 1980
- Liparetrus geminatus Lea, 1924
- Liparetrus germari MacLeay, 1886
- Liparetrus gilvus Britton, 1980
- Liparetrus glaber MacLeay, 1871
- Liparetrus glabripennis MacLeay, 1886
- Liparetrus glauerti Britton, 1980
- Liparetrus globulus MacLeay, 1886
- Liparetrus gracilipes Blackburn, 1888
- Liparetrus gravidus Blackburn, 1905
- Liparetrus halei Britton, 1980
- Liparetrus hattanus Britton, 1980
- Liparetrus hilli Britton, 1980
- Liparetrus hirpex Britton, 1980
- Liparetrus imbricatus Britton, 1980
- Liparetrus impressicollis MacLeay, 1886
- Liparetrus incertus Blackburn, 1905
- Liparetrus insolitus Blackburn, 1905
- Liparetrus insularis Blackburn, 1888
- Liparetrus iridipennis Germar, 1848
- Liparetrus ithonus Britton, 1980
- Liparetrus jenkinsi Britton, 1959
- Liparetrus jubatus Britton, 1980
- Liparetrus karallus Britton, 1980
- Liparetrus karinus Britton, 1980
- Liparetrus kennedyi MacLeay, 1886
- Liparetrus kiatanus Britton, 1980
- Liparetrus kreuslerae MacLeay, 1886
- Liparetrus kungarus Britton, 1980
- Liparetrus laciniatus Lea, 1917
- Liparetrus laeticulus Blackburn, 1889
- Liparetrus laetus Blackburn, 1888
- Liparetrus laevis Blanchard, 1850
- Liparetrus lanaticollis MacLeay, 1888
- Liparetrus lepidopygus Lea, 1917
- Liparetrus limbatus Britton, 1980
- Liparetrus lissapterus Lea, 1917
- Liparetrus lividipennis Blackburn, 1905
- Liparetrus longidens Lea, 1917
- Liparetrus lugens Blackburn, 1892
- Liparetrus luridipennis MacLeay, 1886
- Liparetrus luridus Britton, 1980
- Liparetrus luteus Britton, 1980
- Liparetrus malara Britton, 1959
- Liparetrus marginipennis Blanchard, 1850
- Liparetrus medius Britton, 1980
- Liparetrus melallus Britton, 1959
- Liparetrus melanocephalus Blackburn, 1895
- Liparetrus merredinensis Britton, 1980
- Liparetrus merus Britton, 1980
- Liparetrus micros Britton, 1980
- Liparetrus mimicus Lea, 1917
- Liparetrus mimus Britton, 1980
- Liparetrus minimus Britton, 1980
- Liparetrus minor Blackburn, 1905
- Liparetrus minusculus Britton, 1980
- Liparetrus minutus Britton, 1980
- Liparetrus mixtus Lea, 1919
- Liparetrus modestus Blackburn, 1888
- Liparetrus monartus Britton, 1980
- Liparetrus monticola (Fabricius, 1775)
- Liparetrus mulurus Britton, 1959
- Liparetrus necessarius Blackburn, 1905
- Liparetrus newmani Britton, 1980
- Liparetrus niger Lea, 1917
- Liparetrus nigricollis Hope, 1841
- Liparetrus nigrifrons Britton, 1980
- Liparetrus nigrinus Germar, 1848
- Liparetrus nudipennis Germar, 1848
- Liparetrus nudus Lea, 1917
- Liparetrus obesus Britton, 1980
- Liparetrus obscurior Lea, 1917
- Liparetrus occidentalis MacLeay, 1886
- Liparetrus opacicollis MacLeay, 1886
- Liparetrus opacus Britton, 1980
- Liparetrus orestes Britton, 1980
- Liparetrus orsinus Britton, 1980
- Liparetrus ovipennis Britton, 1980
- Liparetrus pallens Lea, 1917
- Liparetrus pallidulus (MacLeay, 1888)
- Liparetrus pallidus MacLeay, 1871
- Liparetrus palmerstoni Blackburn, 1888
- Liparetrus pandus Britton, 1980
- Liparetrus parvus Britton, 1980
- Liparetrus paryphus Britton, 1980
- Liparetrus paulus Britton, 1980
- Liparetrus pauxillus Britton, 1980
- Liparetrus pectinatus Britton, 1980
- Liparetrus periosus Britton, 1980
- Liparetrus perkinsi Blackburn, 1905
- Liparetrus pezus Britton, 1980
- Liparetrus phoenicopterus Germar, 1848
- Liparetrus pholiotus Britton, 1980
- Liparetrus picipennis Germar, 1848
- Liparetrus pimbus Britton, 1980
- Liparetrus plautus Britton, 1980
- Liparetrus politus Britton, 1980
- Liparetrus posticalis Blackburn, 1888
- Liparetrus puer Blackburn, 1905
- Liparetrus pulvereus Britton, 1980
- Liparetrus pusillus Britton, 1980
- Liparetrus pygmaeus Britton, 1980
- Liparetrus quinquelobatus Lea, 1919
- Liparetrus reburrus Britton, 1980
- Liparetrus robustus Britton, 1980
- Liparetrus rothei Blackburn, 1888
- Liparetrus rotundicollis Blackburn, 1905
- Liparetrus rotundiformis MacLeay, 1886
- Liparetrus rotundipennis MacLeay, 1886
- Liparetrus rubefactus MacLeay, 1886
- Liparetrus rubicundus MacLeay, 1864
- Liparetrus rubrus Britton, 1980
- Liparetrus rufipennis MacLeay, 1864
- Liparetrus rugatus Blackburn, 1905
- Liparetrus satanus Britton, 1980
- Liparetrus seclusus Britton, 1980
- Liparetrus semiatriceps Lea, 1917
- Liparetrus semicastaneus Lea, 1917
- Liparetrus semiflavus Lea, 1917
- Liparetrus septuosus Britton, 1980
- Liparetrus sericeipennis MacLeay, 1886
- Liparetrus sericeus MacLeay, 1871
- Liparetrus simillimus MacLeay, 1886
- Liparetrus simulator Lea, 1926
- Liparetrus squamiger MacLeay, 1886
- Liparetrus squamipennis Britton, 1980
- Liparetrus squamosus Britton, 1980
- Liparetrus striatus Blanchard, 1850
- Liparetrus stygius Britton, 1980
- Liparetrus suavis Blackburn, 1889
- Liparetrus subsquamosus MacLeay, 1886
- Liparetrus sylvicola (Fabricius, 1775)
- Liparetrus tanami Britton, 1980
- Liparetrus tatakus Britton, 1980
- Liparetrus tenebrosus Britton, 1980
- Liparetrus teres Britton, 1980
- Liparetrus tibialis Lea, 1924
- Liparetrus triangulatus Britton, 1959
- Liparetrus trichopygus Lea, 1917
- Liparetrus trichotus Britton, 1980
- Liparetrus tridentatus MacLeay, 1871
- Liparetrus tristis Blanchard, 1850
- Liparetrus trivialis Britton, 1980
- Liparetrus tulanus Britton, 1980
- Liparetrus ulingus Britton, 1980
- Liparetrus umbrosus Britton, 1980
- Liparetrus unidentatus Lea, 1917
- Liparetrus uniformis Blanchard, 1850
- Liparetrus uptoni Britton, 1980
- Liparetrus urbulus Britton, 1980
- Liparetrus validus Britton, 1980
- Liparetrus vastus Britton, 1980
- Liparetrus ventralis Blackburn, 1905
- Liparetrus vespertinus Britton, 1980
- Liparetrus vestitus Blanchard, 1850
- Liparetrus vestjensi Britton, 1980
- Liparetrus vicinus Britton, 1980
- Liparetrus villosus Britton, 1980
- Liparetrus wanamarus Britton, 1980
- Liparetrus waningus Britton, 1980
- Liparetrus wilsoni Britton, 1980
- Liparetrus xanthotrichus Blanchard, 1850
