= Liparetrus discoidalis =

Scientific classification
- Kingdom: Animalia
- Phylum: Arthropoda
- Clade: Pancrustacea
- Class: Insecta
- Order: Coleoptera
- Suborder: Polyphaga
- Infraorder: Scarabaeiformia
- Family: Scarabaeidae
- Genus: Liparetrus
- Species: L. discoidalis

Binomial name
- Liparetrus discoidalis MacLeay, 1864

Species of beetle

Liparetrus discoidalis is a species of beetle of the family Scarabaeidae. It is found in Australia (Queensland).

== Taxonomy ==
This species belongs to the discoidalis species group. The defining characters of this group include the pronotum with setae, but with scales on the disc.

== Description ==
Adults reach a length of about 5.5 mm (0.22 in). The head, pronotum, scutellum and abdomen are black, while the ventral surface is brown and the elytra pale brownish yellow with the posterior third and all margins dark brown. The posterior legs are dark reddish brown, while all other legs are reddish brown. The antennae are pale yellowish brown.
