= Liparetrus pallidus =

Scientific classification
- Kingdom: Animalia
- Phylum: Arthropoda
- Clade: Pancrustacea
- Class: Insecta
- Order: Coleoptera
- Suborder: Polyphaga
- Infraorder: Scarabaeiformia
- Family: Scarabaeidae
- Genus: Liparetrus
- Species: L. pallidus

Binomial name
- Liparetrus pallidus MacLeay, 1871

Species of beetle

Liparetrus pallidus is a species of beetle of the family Scarabaeidae. It is found in Australia (Queensland).

== Taxonomy ==
This species belongs to the convexior species group. The defining characters of this group include the absence of setae and scales on the disc of the pronotum.

== Description ==
Adults reach a length of about 6 mm (0.24 in). The clypeus and pronotum are reddish yellow, the latter with the anterior and posterior margins darker. The frons is brown and the elytra and legs are reddish yellow. The abdomen and ventral surface are pale brownish yellow.
