= Liparetrus limbatus =

Scientific classification
- Kingdom: Animalia
- Phylum: Arthropoda
- Clade: Pancrustacea
- Class: Insecta
- Order: Coleoptera
- Suborder: Polyphaga
- Infraorder: Scarabaeiformia
- Family: Scarabaeidae
- Genus: Liparetrus
- Species: L. limbatus

Binomial name
- Liparetrus limbatus Britton, 1980

Species of beetle

Liparetrus limbatus is a species of beetle of the family Scarabaeidae. It is found in Australia (Western Australia).

== Taxonomy ==
This species belongs to the alienus species group. The defining characters of this group include setae on the disc of the pronotum and the disc of the elytra.

== Description ==
Adults reach a length of about 4.5 mm (0.18 in). The head and pronotum are black and the scutellum is also black, but with reddish edges. The elytra are pale yellowish brown, the ventral surface is black, the abdomen is black or brown and the legs are reddish brown. The antennae are reddish brown with a black club.
