= Liparetrus atriceps =

Scientific classification
- Kingdom: Animalia
- Phylum: Arthropoda
- Clade: Pancrustacea
- Class: Insecta
- Order: Coleoptera
- Suborder: Polyphaga
- Infraorder: Scarabaeiformia
- Family: Scarabaeidae
- Genus: Liparetrus
- Species: L. atriceps

Binomial name
- Liparetrus atriceps MacLeay, 1864

Synonyms
- Liparetrus fallax Blackburn, 1888; Liparetrus micans MacLeay, 1886

Species of beetle

Liparetrus atriceps is a species of beetle of the family Scarabaeidae. It is found in Australia (Queensland, Northern Territory).

== Taxonomy ==
This species belongs to the rufipennis species group. The defining characters of this group include the absence of setae and scales on the disc of the pronotum.

== Description ==
Adults reach a length of about 7.5–9 mm (0.30–0.35 in). The head is black and the pronotum is bright reddish yellow with black margins. The elytra are pale yellowish brown with a black base, and sometimes with darkened margins. The ventral surface and the base of the abdomen are black. The legs and antennae are yellowish brown.
