= Liparetrus subsquamosus =

Scientific classification
- Kingdom: Animalia
- Phylum: Arthropoda
- Clade: Pancrustacea
- Class: Insecta
- Order: Coleoptera
- Suborder: Polyphaga
- Infraorder: Scarabaeiformia
- Family: Scarabaeidae
- Genus: Liparetrus
- Species: L. subsquamosus

Binomial name
- Liparetrus subsquamosus MacLeay, 1886

Species of beetle

Liparetrus subsquamosus is a species of beetle of the family Scarabaeidae. It is found in Australia (Northern Territory).

== Taxonomy ==
This species belongs to the atratus species group. The defining characters of this group include the absence of scales on the clypeus, frons, pronotum and abdomen.

== Description ==
Adults reach a length of about 6 mm (0.24 in). The head and pronotum are black, while the rest of the body is dark brown and the legs and antennae reddish yellow.
