= Liparetrus politus =

Scientific classification
- Kingdom: Animalia
- Phylum: Arthropoda
- Clade: Pancrustacea
- Class: Insecta
- Order: Coleoptera
- Suborder: Polyphaga
- Infraorder: Scarabaeiformia
- Family: Scarabaeidae
- Genus: Liparetrus
- Species: L. politus

Binomial name
- Liparetrus politus Britton, 1980

Species of beetle

Liparetrus politus is a species of beetle of the family Scarabaeidae. It is found in Australia (Queensland, Northern Territory).

== Taxonomy ==
This species belongs to the rufipennis species group. The defining characters of this group include the absence of setae and scales on the disc of the pronotum.

== Description ==
Adults reach a length of about 8.5–9.5 mm (0.33–0.37 in). They are dark reddish brown, with a darker frons. The pronotum and elytra have pale yellowish margins.
