= Liparetrus simillimus =

Scientific classification
- Kingdom: Animalia
- Phylum: Arthropoda
- Clade: Pancrustacea
- Class: Insecta
- Order: Coleoptera
- Suborder: Polyphaga
- Infraorder: Scarabaeiformia
- Family: Scarabaeidae
- Genus: Liparetrus
- Species: L. simillimus

Binomial name
- Liparetrus simillimus MacLeay, 1886

Species of beetle

Liparetrus simillimus is a species of beetle of the family Scarabaeidae. It is found in Australia (South Australia, Western Australia, Northern Territory).

== Taxonomy ==
This species belongs to the gracilipes species group. The defining characters of this group include the absence of setae on the discs of the pronotum and elytra, while the pronotum is either without setae on the anterior margin or with only a few setae on each side.

== Description ==
Adults reach a length of about 8–9 mm (0.31–0.35 in). The head is reddish brown, and the rest of the body, including the legs, is reddish or yellowish brown.
