= Liparetrus ovipennis =

Scientific classification
- Kingdom: Animalia
- Phylum: Arthropoda
- Clade: Pancrustacea
- Class: Insecta
- Order: Coleoptera
- Suborder: Polyphaga
- Infraorder: Scarabaeiformia
- Family: Scarabaeidae
- Genus: Liparetrus
- Species: L. ovipennis

Binomial name
- Liparetrus ovipennis Britton, 1980

Species of beetle

Liparetrus ovipennis is a species of beetle of the family Scarabaeidae. It is found in Australia (Western Australia, New South Wales).

== Taxonomy ==
This species belongs to the concolor species group. The defining characters of this group include the absence of setae on the discs of the pronotum and elytra, while the pronotum has a fringe of setae along the anterior margin.

== Description ==
Adults reach a length of about 7.5 mm (0.30 in). The head and pronotum are black, while the elytra are yellowish brown with a darkened base. The ventral surface is dark brown and the abdomen reddish yellow, but darkened at the base.
