= Liparetrus rotundiformis =

Scientific classification
- Kingdom: Animalia
- Phylum: Arthropoda
- Clade: Pancrustacea
- Class: Insecta
- Order: Coleoptera
- Suborder: Polyphaga
- Infraorder: Scarabaeiformia
- Family: Scarabaeidae
- Genus: Liparetrus
- Species: L. rotundiformis

Binomial name
- Liparetrus rotundiformis MacLeay, 1886

Species of beetle

Liparetrus rotundiformis is a species of beetle of the family Scarabaeidae. It is found in Australia (Western Australia).

== Taxonomy ==
This species belongs to the capillatus species group. The defining characters of this group include the absence of setae on the disc of the pronotum, although sometimes scales are present.

== Description ==
Adults reach a length of about 4.5 mm (0.18 in). The head and pronotum are black, while the elytra are black or dark brown with pale yellow apical margins. The abdomen, ventral surface and legs are dark brown.
