= Liparetrus lanaticollis =

Scientific classification
- Kingdom: Animalia
- Phylum: Arthropoda
- Clade: Pancrustacea
- Class: Insecta
- Order: Coleoptera
- Suborder: Polyphaga
- Infraorder: Scarabaeiformia
- Family: Scarabaeidae
- Genus: Liparetrus
- Species: L. lanaticollis

Binomial name
- Liparetrus lanaticollis MacLeay, 1888

Synonyms
- Liparetrus albovillosus Lea, 1917

Species of beetle

Liparetrus lanaticollis is a species of beetle of the family Scarabaeidae. It is found in Australia (Queensland, Western Australia).

== Taxonomy ==
This species belongs to the lanaticollis species group. The defining characters of this group include the absence of setae on the disc of the elytra, Furthermore, the base and apex of the elytra are usually darker than the disc.

== Description ==
Adults reach a length of about 5 mm (0.20 in). The head and pronotum are black and shining, while the elytra are pale yellowish brown with dark brown margins. The abdomen is black in males or black at the base and with the two distal segments pale yellowish brown in females. The ventral thorax is brown or dark brown.
