= Liparetrus rubicundus =

Scientific classification
- Kingdom: Animalia
- Phylum: Arthropoda
- Clade: Pancrustacea
- Class: Insecta
- Order: Coleoptera
- Suborder: Polyphaga
- Infraorder: Scarabaeiformia
- Family: Scarabaeidae
- Genus: Liparetrus
- Species: L. rubicundus

Binomial name
- Liparetrus rubicundus MacLeay, 1864

Synonyms
- Liparetrus irregularis Lea, 1917; Liparetrus propinquus MacLeay, 1886

Species of beetle

Liparetrus rubicundus is a species of beetle of the family Scarabaeidae. It is found in Australia (Queensland).

== Taxonomy ==
This species belongs to the capillatus species group. The defining characters of this group include the absence of setae on the disc of the pronotum, although sometimes scales are present.

== Description ==
Adults reach a length of about 5–7 mm (0.20–0.28 in). The head is black, while the ventral thorax is black or brown and the pronotum reddish yellow with a black posterior edge, or all black. The elytra are yellowish brown with a black basal area and the abdomen is reddish yellow with a dark brown base. In some specimens, the abdomen is completely black.
