= Liparetrus triangulatus =

Scientific classification
- Kingdom: Animalia
- Phylum: Arthropoda
- Clade: Pancrustacea
- Class: Insecta
- Order: Coleoptera
- Suborder: Polyphaga
- Infraorder: Scarabaeiformia
- Family: Scarabaeidae
- Genus: Liparetrus
- Species: L. triangulatus

Binomial name
- Liparetrus triangulatus Britton, 1959

Species of beetle

Liparetrus triangulatus is a species of beetle of the family Scarabaeidae. It is found in Australia (Western Australia).

== Taxonomy ==
This species belongs to the sericeus species group. The defining characters of this group include a suture on each side of the propygidium, the absence of setae on the disc of the pronotum and the short elytra.

== Description ==
Adults reach a length of about 4.5–6 mm (0.18–0.24 in). The head is black, the pronotum black or dark brown with a pale yellow anterior margin, and the elytra are pale yellowish brown with darkened areas. The ventral surface is black and the abdomen is also in black in males, but pale yellowish brown in females. The legs are pale reddish brown.
