= Liparetrus atrox =

Scientific classification
- Kingdom: Animalia
- Phylum: Arthropoda
- Clade: Pancrustacea
- Class: Insecta
- Order: Coleoptera
- Suborder: Polyphaga
- Infraorder: Scarabaeiformia
- Family: Scarabaeidae
- Genus: Liparetrus
- Species: L. atrox

Binomial name
- Liparetrus atrox Britton, 1980

Species of beetle

Liparetrus atrox is a species of beetle of the family Scarabaeidae. It is found in Australia (Western Australia).

== Taxonomy ==
This species belongs to the gracilipes species group. The defining characters of this group include the absence of setae on the discs of the pronotum and elytra, while the pronotum is either without setae on the anterior margin or with only a few setae on each side.

== Description ==
Adults reach a length of about 6.5–7.5 mm (0.26–0.30 in). The body is black or very dark reddish brown and the antennae are yellowish brown with a dark brown club.
