= Liparetrus adelus =

Scientific classification
- Kingdom: Animalia
- Phylum: Arthropoda
- Clade: Pancrustacea
- Class: Insecta
- Order: Coleoptera
- Suborder: Polyphaga
- Infraorder: Scarabaeiformia
- Family: Scarabaeidae
- Genus: Liparetrus
- Species: L. adelus

Binomial name
- Liparetrus adelus Britton, 1980

Species of beetle

Liparetrus adelus is a species of beetle of the family Scarabaeidae. It is found in Australia (Western Australia).

== Taxonomy ==
This species belongs to the convexior species group. The defining characters of this group include the absence of setae and scales on the disc of the pronotum.

== Description ==
Adults reach a length of about 8–10 mm (0.31–0.39 in). The head is dark reddish brown, while the remainder of the body is reddish brown (becoming paler posteriorly).
