= Liparetrus arenosus =

Scientific classification
- Kingdom: Animalia
- Phylum: Arthropoda
- Clade: Pancrustacea
- Class: Insecta
- Order: Coleoptera
- Suborder: Polyphaga
- Infraorder: Scarabaeiformia
- Family: Scarabaeidae
- Genus: Liparetrus
- Species: L. arenosus

Binomial name
- Liparetrus arenosus Britton, 1980

Species of beetle

Liparetrus arenosus is a species of beetle of the family Scarabaeidae. It is found in Australia (Queensland).

== Taxonomy ==
This species belongs to the flavus species group. The defining characters of this group include the absence of obvious setae on the disc of the pronotum, the glabrous or setate (but without scales) propygidium and pygidium, the elongate elytra and the pale yellowish brown colour of the body.

== Description ==
Adults reach a length of about 5.5–7 mm (0.22–0.28 in). The pronotum has a broad, pale anterior margin with a sparse fringe of yellowish setae. The lateral edges of the elytra bear a dense fringe of setae and the propygidium and pygidium are covered with short setae.
