= Liparetrus comes =

Scientific classification
- Kingdom: Animalia
- Phylum: Arthropoda
- Clade: Pancrustacea
- Class: Insecta
- Order: Coleoptera
- Suborder: Polyphaga
- Infraorder: Scarabaeiformia
- Family: Scarabaeidae
- Genus: Liparetrus
- Species: L. comes

Binomial name
- Liparetrus comes Britton, 1980

Species of beetle

Liparetrus comes is a species of beetle of the family Scarabaeidae. It is found in Australia (Victoria).

== Taxonomy ==
This species belongs to the gracilipes species group. The defining characters of this group include the absence of setae on the discs of the pronotum and elytra, while the pronotum is either without setae on the anterior margin or with only a few setae on each side.

== Description ==
Adults reach a length of about 6.5–10 mm (0.26–0.39 in). They are shining black, the pronotum with a pale yellow anterior margin and the elytra with brown apical margins. The antennae are yellowish brown.
