= Liparetrus cinnameus =

Scientific classification
- Kingdom: Animalia
- Phylum: Arthropoda
- Clade: Pancrustacea
- Class: Insecta
- Order: Coleoptera
- Suborder: Polyphaga
- Infraorder: Scarabaeiformia
- Family: Scarabaeidae
- Genus: Liparetrus
- Species: L. cinnameus

Binomial name
- Liparetrus cinnameus Britton, 1980

Species of beetle

Liparetrus cinnameus is a species of beetle of the family Scarabaeidae. It is found in Australia (Northern Territory, Queensland, New South Wales, South Australia).

== Taxonomy ==
This species belongs to the flavus species group. The defining characters of this group include the absence of obvious setae on the disc of the pronotum, the glabrous or setate (but without scales) propygidium and pygidium, the elongate elytra and the pale yellowish brown colour of the body.

== Description ==
Adults reach a length of about 5–7 mm (0.20–0.28 in). The pronotum is rather dull and has a fringe of setae, which is interrupted in the middle. The elytra are shining and have some sparse, short setae.
