= Liparetrus teres =

Scientific classification
- Kingdom: Animalia
- Phylum: Arthropoda
- Clade: Pancrustacea
- Class: Insecta
- Order: Coleoptera
- Suborder: Polyphaga
- Infraorder: Scarabaeiformia
- Family: Scarabaeidae
- Genus: Liparetrus
- Species: L. teres

Binomial name
- Liparetrus teres Britton, 1980

Species of beetle

Liparetrus teres is a species of beetle of the family Scarabaeidae. It is found in Australia (Queensland).

== Taxonomy ==
This species belongs to the ferrugineus species group.

== Description ==
Adults reach a length of about 5.5–6.5 mm (0.22–0.26 in). They have a black body, although sometimes the disc of the elytra is reddish yellow and the margins may be black. The legs are dark brown to black and the antennae are reddish yellow with a black club.
