= Liparetrus rothei =

Scientific classification
- Kingdom: Animalia
- Phylum: Arthropoda
- Clade: Pancrustacea
- Class: Insecta
- Order: Coleoptera
- Suborder: Polyphaga
- Infraorder: Scarabaeiformia
- Family: Scarabaeidae
- Genus: Liparetrus
- Species: L. rothei

Binomial name
- Liparetrus rothei Blackburn, 1888

Species of beetle

Liparetrus rothei is a species of beetle of the family Scarabaeidae. It is found in Australia (South Australia).

== Taxonomy ==
This species belongs to the capillatus species group. The defining characters of this group include the absence of setae on the disc of the pronotum, although sometimes scales are present.

== Description ==
Adults reach a length of about 3–4 mm (0.12–0.16 in). The head and pronotum are black, while the abdomen and ventral surface are dark brown and the elytra yellowish brown with darkened margins. The antennae are yellowish brown with a brown club and the legs are yellowish brown.
