= Liparetrus capillatus =

Scientific classification
- Kingdom: Animalia
- Phylum: Arthropoda
- Clade: Pancrustacea
- Class: Insecta
- Order: Coleoptera
- Suborder: Polyphaga
- Infraorder: Scarabaeiformia
- Family: Scarabaeidae
- Genus: Liparetrus
- Species: L. capillatus

Binomial name
- Liparetrus capillatus MacLeay, 1886

Species of beetle

Liparetrus capillatus is a species of beetle of the family Scarabaeidae. It is found in Australia (Western Australia).

== Taxonomy ==
This species belongs to the capillatus species group. The defining characters of this group include the absence of setae on the disc of the pronotum, although sometimes scales are present.

== Description ==
Adults reach a length of about 7–10 mm (0.28–0.39 in). The head and pronotum are black, while the elytra are reddish brown with a black basal area. In some specimens, the elytra are completely black. The ventral surface and abdomen are dark brown or black.
