= Liparetrus opacus =

Scientific classification
- Kingdom: Animalia
- Phylum: Arthropoda
- Clade: Pancrustacea
- Class: Insecta
- Order: Coleoptera
- Suborder: Polyphaga
- Infraorder: Scarabaeiformia
- Family: Scarabaeidae
- Genus: Liparetrus
- Species: L. opacus

Binomial name
- Liparetrus opacus Britton, 1980

Species of beetle

Liparetrus opacus is a species of beetle of the family Scarabaeidae. It is found in Australia (Western Australia).

== Taxonomy ==
This species belongs to the alienus species group. The defining characters of this group include setae on the disc of the pronotum and the disc of the elytra.

== Description ==
Adults reach a length of about 5.4 mm (0.21 in). The head, pronotum and abdomen are black. The elytra are black at the base but becoming yellowish brown towards the apex. The antennae are yellowish brown with the lamellae black and the legs are yellowish brown.
