= Liparetrus tulanus =

Scientific classification
- Kingdom: Animalia
- Phylum: Arthropoda
- Clade: Pancrustacea
- Class: Insecta
- Order: Coleoptera
- Suborder: Polyphaga
- Infraorder: Scarabaeiformia
- Family: Scarabaeidae
- Genus: Liparetrus
- Species: L. tulanus

Binomial name
- Liparetrus tulanus Britton, 1980

Species of beetle

Liparetrus tulanus is a species of beetle of the family Scarabaeidae. It is found in Australia (Western Australia).

== Taxonomy ==
This species belongs to the gracilipes species group. The defining characters of this group include the absence of setae on the discs of the pronotum and elytra, while the pronotum is either without setae on the anterior margin or with only a few setae on each side.

== Description ==
Adults reach a length of about 7–9 mm (0.28–0.35 in). The head is black, while the pronotum and ventral surface are black or dark brown and the elytra light yellowish brown, but somewhat darkened at the margins. The abdomen is either dark brown, or with the pygidium and apical half of the propygidium light reddish. The legs are reddish to dark brown and the antennae are reddish yellow.
