= Liparetrus rotundipennis =

Scientific classification
- Kingdom: Animalia
- Phylum: Arthropoda
- Clade: Pancrustacea
- Class: Insecta
- Order: Coleoptera
- Suborder: Polyphaga
- Infraorder: Scarabaeiformia
- Family: Scarabaeidae
- Genus: Liparetrus
- Species: L. rotundipennis

Binomial name
- Liparetrus rotundipennis MacLeay, 1886

Synonyms
- Liparetrus simplex Blackburn, 1888

Species of beetle

Liparetrus rotundipennis is a species of beetle of the family Scarabaeidae. It is found in Australia (South Australia, Victoria).

== Taxonomy ==
This species belongs to the dixoni species group. The defining characters of this group include the covering of broad scales on the clypeus, frons, pronotum and abdomen.

== Description ==
Adults reach a length of about 6 mm (0.24 in). The body is dark brown to black with reddish brown elytra and legs. The antennae are yellowish with a brown club.
