= Liparetrus validus =

Scientific classification
- Kingdom: Animalia
- Phylum: Arthropoda
- Clade: Pancrustacea
- Class: Insecta
- Order: Coleoptera
- Suborder: Polyphaga
- Infraorder: Scarabaeiformia
- Family: Scarabaeidae
- Genus: Liparetrus
- Species: L. validus

Binomial name
- Liparetrus validus Britton, 1980

Species of beetle

Liparetrus validus is a species of beetle of the family Scarabaeidae. It is found in Australia (Western Australia).

== Taxonomy ==
This species belongs to the rufipennis species group. The defining characters of this group include the absence of setae and scales on the disc of the pronotum.

== Description ==
Adults reach a length of about 12 mm (0.47 in). The head and pronotum are black, while the rest of the body and the elytra are very dark brown to black. The antennae are reddish yellow, with a partly black club. The legs are dark reddish brown.
