= Liparetrus convexiusculus =

Scientific classification
- Kingdom: Animalia
- Phylum: Arthropoda
- Clade: Pancrustacea
- Class: Insecta
- Order: Coleoptera
- Suborder: Polyphaga
- Infraorder: Scarabaeiformia
- Family: Scarabaeidae
- Genus: Liparetrus
- Species: L. convexiusculus

Binomial name
- Liparetrus convexiusculus MacLeay, 1883

Synonyms
- Liparetrus acutangulus Lea, 1919

Species of beetle

Liparetrus convexiusculus is a species of beetle of the family Scarabaeidae. It is found in Australia (Queensland).

== Taxonomy ==
This species belongs to the gracilipes species group. The defining characters of this group include the absence of setae on the discs of the pronotum and elytra, while the pronotum is either without setae on the anterior margin or with only a few setae on each side.

== Description ==
Adults reach a length of about 6–7.5 mm (0.24–0.30 in). The head and pronotum are black, while the elytra and apex of the abdomen are reddish yellow. The base of the abdomen and ventral surface are dark brown.
