= Liparetrus rufipennis =

Scientific classification
- Kingdom: Animalia
- Phylum: Arthropoda
- Clade: Pancrustacea
- Class: Insecta
- Order: Coleoptera
- Suborder: Polyphaga
- Infraorder: Scarabaeiformia
- Family: Scarabaeidae
- Genus: Liparetrus
- Species: L. rufipennis

Binomial name
- Liparetrus rufipennis MacLeay, 1864

Species of beetle

Liparetrus rufipennis is a species of beetle of the family Scarabaeidae. It is found in Australia (Queensland, Northern Territory).

== Taxonomy ==
This species belongs to the rufipennis species group. The defining characters of this group include the absence of setae and scales on the disc of the pronotum.

== Description ==
Adults reach a length of about 7–10 mm (0.28–0.39 in). The head and pronotum are black, while the abdomen, ventral surface and legs are dark reddish brown. The elytra are light reddish brown with a black basal area.
