= Liparetrus convexior =

Scientific classification
- Kingdom: Animalia
- Phylum: Arthropoda
- Clade: Pancrustacea
- Class: Insecta
- Order: Coleoptera
- Suborder: Polyphaga
- Infraorder: Scarabaeiformia
- Family: Scarabaeidae
- Genus: Liparetrus
- Species: L. convexior

Binomial name
- Liparetrus convexior MacLeay, 1886

Synonyms
- Liparetrus caviceps Blackburn, 1888

Species of beetle

Liparetrus convexior is a species of beetle of the family Scarabaeidae. It is found in Australia (South Australia).

== Taxonomy ==
This species belongs to the convexior species group. The defining characters of this group include the absence of setae and scales on the disc of the pronotum.

== Description ==
Adults reach a length of about 6.5–7 mm (0.26–0.28 in). They are completely black, except for the reddish brown anterior tibiae and tarsi. Furthermore, the antennae are yellowish brown and the elytra are sometimes reddish brown with dark margins.
