= Liparetrus paulus =

Scientific classification
- Kingdom: Animalia
- Phylum: Arthropoda
- Clade: Pancrustacea
- Class: Insecta
- Order: Coleoptera
- Suborder: Polyphaga
- Infraorder: Scarabaeiformia
- Family: Scarabaeidae
- Genus: Liparetrus
- Species: L. paulus

Binomial name
- Liparetrus paulus Britton, 1980

Species of beetle

Liparetrus paulus is a species of beetle of the family Scarabaeidae. It is found in Australia (Western Australia).

== Taxonomy ==
This species belongs to the flavus species group. The defining characters of this group include the absence of obvious setae on the disc of the pronotum, the glabrous or setate (but without scales) propygidium and pygidium, the elongate elytra and the pale yellowish brown colour of the body.

== Description ==
Adults reach a length of about 4–5.5 mm (0.16–0.22 in). They are completely pale yellowish brown.
