= Liparetrus amplus =

Scientific classification
- Kingdom: Animalia
- Phylum: Arthropoda
- Clade: Pancrustacea
- Class: Insecta
- Order: Coleoptera
- Suborder: Polyphaga
- Infraorder: Scarabaeiformia
- Family: Scarabaeidae
- Genus: Liparetrus
- Species: L. amplus

Binomial name
- Liparetrus amplus Britton, 1980

Species of beetle

Liparetrus amplus is a species of beetle of the family Scarabaeidae. It is found in Australia (Western Australia).

== Taxonomy ==
This species belongs to the capillatus species group. The defining characters of this group include the absence of setae on the disc of the pronotum, although sometimes scales are present.

== Description ==
Adults reach a length of about 13 mm (0.51 in). The head, pronotum, abdomen and ventral surface are black, while the legs are dark brown to black. The elytra are dark reddish brown, with a reddish yellow apical border. The antennae are reddish yellow with mostly brown club.
