= Liparetrus pholiotus =

Scientific classification
- Kingdom: Animalia
- Phylum: Arthropoda
- Clade: Pancrustacea
- Class: Insecta
- Order: Coleoptera
- Suborder: Polyphaga
- Infraorder: Scarabaeiformia
- Family: Scarabaeidae
- Genus: Liparetrus
- Species: L. pholiotus

Binomial name
- Liparetrus pholiotus Britton, 1980

Species of beetle

Liparetrus pholiotus is a species of beetle of the family Scarabaeidae. It is found in Australia (Western Australia).

== Taxonomy ==
This species belongs to the lanaticollis species group. The defining characters of this group include the absence of setae on the disc of the elytra, Furthermore, the base and apex of the elytra are usually darker than the disc.

== Description ==
Adults reach a length of about 6 mm (0.24 in). The head, pronotum, abdomen and ventral surface are black, while the elytra are pale yellowish brown with dark brown or black margins. The legs are dark brown except for the reddish brown anterior tibiae and all tarsi.
