= Liparetrus pygmaeus =

Scientific classification
- Kingdom: Animalia
- Phylum: Arthropoda
- Clade: Pancrustacea
- Class: Insecta
- Order: Coleoptera
- Suborder: Polyphaga
- Infraorder: Scarabaeiformia
- Family: Scarabaeidae
- Genus: Liparetrus
- Species: L. pygmaeus

Binomial name
- Liparetrus pygmaeus Britton, 1980

Species of beetle

Liparetrus pygmaeus is a species of beetle of the family Scarabaeidae. It is found in Australia (Queensland).

== Taxonomy ==
This species belongs to the monticola species group.

== Description ==
Adults reach a length of about 4.2 mm (0.17 in). The body is black, with the elytra dark reddish on the apical half. The legs are dark reddish and the antennae are pale yellow with a darker club.
