= Liparetrus picipennis =

Scientific classification
- Kingdom: Animalia
- Phylum: Arthropoda
- Clade: Pancrustacea
- Class: Insecta
- Order: Coleoptera
- Suborder: Polyphaga
- Infraorder: Scarabaeiformia
- Family: Scarabaeidae
- Genus: Liparetrus
- Species: L. picipennis

Binomial name
- Liparetrus picipennis Germar, 1848

Synonyms
- Liparetrus nitidior MacLeay, 1886; Liparetrus obscurus MacLeay, 1886

Species of beetle

Liparetrus picipennis is a species of beetle of the family Scarabaeidae. It is found in Australia (South Australia, Victoria, Western Australia).

== Taxonomy ==
This species belongs to the sericeus species group. The defining characters of this group include a suture on each side of the propygidium, the absence of setae on the disc of the pronotum and the short elytra.

== Description ==
Adults reach a length of about 6–8.5 mm (0.24–0.33 in). The head, pronotum, scutellum and ventral surface are black, while the elytra are reddish brown. The antennae are yellowish brown, with a dark brown club and the legs are dark reddish brown.
