= Liparetrus pandus =

Scientific classification
- Kingdom: Animalia
- Phylum: Arthropoda
- Clade: Pancrustacea
- Class: Insecta
- Order: Coleoptera
- Suborder: Polyphaga
- Infraorder: Scarabaeiformia
- Family: Scarabaeidae
- Genus: Liparetrus
- Species: L. pandus

Binomial name
- Liparetrus pandus Britton, 1980

Species of beetle

Liparetrus pandus is a species of beetle of the family Scarabaeidae. It is found in Australia (South Australia).

== Taxonomy ==
This species belongs to the fulvohirtus species group. The defining characters of this group include the presence of setae on the discs of the pronotum and elytra.

== Description ==
Adults reach a length of about 8–11 mm (0.31–0.43 in). The head, pronotum and abdomen are black, while the elytra are reddish brown with a black base. The legs are reddish yellow and the antennae are yellowish brown.
