= Liparetrus stygius =

Scientific classification
- Kingdom: Animalia
- Phylum: Arthropoda
- Clade: Pancrustacea
- Class: Insecta
- Order: Coleoptera
- Suborder: Polyphaga
- Infraorder: Scarabaeiformia
- Family: Scarabaeidae
- Genus: Liparetrus
- Species: L. stygius

Binomial name
- Liparetrus stygius Britton, 1980

Species of beetle

Liparetrus stygius is a species of beetle of the family Scarabaeidae. It is found in Australia (Western Australia).

== Taxonomy ==
This species belongs to the laetus species group.

== Description ==
Adults reach a length of about 9–10 mm (0.35–0.39 in). The head is black, while the rest of the body is dark brown and the legs are reddish brown. The antennae are pale reddish with a dark brown club.
