= Liparetrus glaber =

Scientific classification
- Kingdom: Animalia
- Phylum: Arthropoda
- Clade: Pancrustacea
- Class: Insecta
- Order: Coleoptera
- Suborder: Polyphaga
- Infraorder: Scarabaeiformia
- Family: Scarabaeidae
- Genus: Liparetrus
- Species: L. glaber

Binomial name
- Liparetrus glaber MacLeay, 1871

Synonyms
- Liparetrus laevatus MacLeay, 1886; Liparetrus parvulus MacLeay, 1871

Species of beetle

Liparetrus glaber is a species of beetle of the family Scarabaeidae. It is found in Australia (Queensland).

== Taxonomy ==
This species belongs to the monticola species group.

== Description ==
Adults reach a length of about 5 mm (0.20 in). The head, pronotum, scutellum and ventral surface are black, while the elytra and abdomen are yellowish brown in females. In males, the elytra are yellowish brown and the abdomen is black, although both the elytra and abdomen are black other males. The legs are dark reddish brown to black and the antennae are yellow with a brown club.
