= Liparetrus kreuslerae =

Scientific classification
- Kingdom: Animalia
- Phylum: Arthropoda
- Clade: Pancrustacea
- Class: Insecta
- Order: Coleoptera
- Suborder: Polyphaga
- Infraorder: Scarabaeiformia
- Family: Scarabaeidae
- Genus: Liparetrus
- Species: L. kreuslerae

Binomial name
- Liparetrus kreuslerae MacLeay, 1886

Species of beetle

Liparetrus kreuslerae is a species of beetle of the family Scarabaeidae. It is found in Australia (South Australia).

== Taxonomy ==
This species belongs to the concolor species group. The defining characters of this group include the absence of setae on the discs of the pronotum and elytra, while the pronotum has a fringe of setae along the anterior margin.

== Description ==
Adults reach a length of about 8–11 mm (0.31–0.43 in). The body is black with dark reddish brown legs. The antennae are yellowish with a brown club.
