= Liparetrus criniger =

Scientific classification
- Kingdom: Animalia
- Phylum: Arthropoda
- Clade: Pancrustacea
- Class: Insecta
- Order: Coleoptera
- Suborder: Polyphaga
- Infraorder: Scarabaeiformia
- Family: Scarabaeidae
- Genus: Liparetrus
- Species: L. criniger

Binomial name
- Liparetrus criniger MacLeay, 1886

Synonyms
- Liparetrus perplexus Blackburn, 1888

Species of beetle

Liparetrus criniger is a species of beetle of the family Scarabaeidae. It is found in Australia (South Australia).

== Taxonomy ==
This species belongs to the marginipennis species group. The defining characters of this group include the presence of setae on the disc of the pronotum. The elytra normally also have setae on the disc, but these may be absent, in which case there is at least a continuous fringe of setae on the anterior margin.

== Description ==
Adults reach a length of about 6.5–8 mm (0.26–0.31 in). The head and pronotum are black, while the ventral surface and abdomen are brown. The elytra are yellowish brown with a darkened base.
