= Liparetrus sericeus =

Scientific classification
- Kingdom: Animalia
- Phylum: Arthropoda
- Clade: Pancrustacea
- Class: Insecta
- Order: Coleoptera
- Suborder: Polyphaga
- Infraorder: Scarabaeiformia
- Family: Scarabaeidae
- Genus: Liparetrus
- Species: L. sericeus

Binomial name
- Liparetrus sericeus MacLeay, 1871

Synonyms
- Liparetrus latiusculus MacLeay, 1886

Species of beetle

Liparetrus sericeus is a species of beetle of the family Scarabaeidae. It is found in Australia (Queensland).

== Taxonomy ==
This species belongs to the sericeus species group. The defining characters of this group include a suture on each side of the propygidium, the absence of setae on the disc of the pronotum and the short elytra.

== Description ==
Adults reach a length of about 6–7 mm (0.24–0.28 in). The head, pronotum, scutellum, abdomen and ventral surface are black and the legs are black, but reddish towards the apices. The elytra are reddish brown with the lateral and basal margins darkened.
