= Liparetrus atomus =

Scientific classification
- Kingdom: Animalia
- Phylum: Arthropoda
- Clade: Pancrustacea
- Class: Insecta
- Order: Coleoptera
- Suborder: Polyphaga
- Infraorder: Scarabaeiformia
- Family: Scarabaeidae
- Genus: Liparetrus
- Species: L. atomus

Binomial name
- Liparetrus atomus Britton, 1959

Species of beetle

Liparetrus atomus is a species of beetle of the family Scarabaeidae. It is found in Australia (Northern Territory, Western Australia).

== Taxonomy ==
This species belongs to the monticola species group.

== Description ==
Adults reach a length of about 4 mm (0.16 in). The whole body and legs are pale yellowish brown.
