= Liparetrus amabilis =

Scientific classification
- Kingdom: Animalia
- Phylum: Arthropoda
- Clade: Pancrustacea
- Class: Insecta
- Order: Coleoptera
- Suborder: Polyphaga
- Infraorder: Scarabaeiformia
- Family: Scarabaeidae
- Genus: Liparetrus
- Species: L. amabilis

Binomial name
- Liparetrus amabilis Blackburn, 1905

Species of beetle

Liparetrus amabilis is a species of beetle of the family Scarabaeidae. It is found in Australia (New South Wales, Victoria).

== Taxonomy ==
This species belongs to the atratus species group. The defining characters of this group include the absence of scales on the clypeus, frons, pronotum and abdomen.

== Description ==
Adults reach a length of about 5.5–6 mm (0.22–0.24 in). The head, pronotum and ventral thorax are mainly black, while the elytra are yellowish brown with darkened margins. The abdomen is black in males and pale yellowish brown in females. The antennae are yellow with a dark club.
