= Liparetrus rotundicollis =

Scientific classification
- Kingdom: Animalia
- Phylum: Arthropoda
- Clade: Pancrustacea
- Class: Insecta
- Order: Coleoptera
- Suborder: Polyphaga
- Infraorder: Scarabaeiformia
- Family: Scarabaeidae
- Genus: Liparetrus
- Species: L. rotundicollis

Binomial name
- Liparetrus rotundicollis Blackburn, 1905

Species of beetle

Liparetrus rotundicollis is a species of beetle of the family Scarabaeidae. It is found in Australia (South Australia, Victoria).

== Taxonomy ==
This species belongs to the discipennis species group. The defining characters of this group include the presence of long setae on the disc of the elytra (at least towards the base).

== Description ==
Adults reach a length of about 7 mm (0.28 in). The body is either completely black or has the disc of the elytra and apex of the abdomen dark reddish brown.
