= Liparetrus kennedyi =

Scientific classification
- Kingdom: Animalia
- Phylum: Arthropoda
- Clade: Pancrustacea
- Class: Insecta
- Order: Coleoptera
- Suborder: Polyphaga
- Infraorder: Scarabaeiformia
- Family: Scarabaeidae
- Genus: Liparetrus
- Species: L. kennedyi

Binomial name
- Liparetrus kennedyi MacLeay, 1886

Synonyms
- Liparetrus majorinus Lea, 1919

Species of beetle

Liparetrus kennedyi is a species of beetle of the family Scarabaeidae. It is found in Australia (New South Wales, Queensland).

== Taxonomy ==
This species belongs to the fulvohirtus species group. The defining characters of this group include the presence of setae on the discs of the pronotum and elytra.

== Description ==
Adults reach a length of about 11 mm (0.43 in). They have a black body, with the elytra bright reddish brown with a black basal area. The legs are reddish yellow and all setae are very pale yellowish white.
