= Liparetrus sylvicola =

Scientific classification
- Kingdom: Animalia
- Phylum: Arthropoda
- Clade: Pancrustacea
- Class: Insecta
- Order: Coleoptera
- Suborder: Polyphaga
- Infraorder: Scarabaeiformia
- Family: Scarabaeidae
- Genus: Liparetrus
- Species: L. sylvicola

Binomial name
- Liparetrus sylvicola (Fabricius, 1775)

Synonyms
- Melolontha sylvicola Fabricius, 1775; Liparetrus vicarius Blackburn, 1905; Liparetrus juvenis Blackburn, 1888

Species of beetle

Liparetrus sylvicola is a species of beetle of the family Scarabaeidae. It is found in Australia (Queensland, Northern Territory).

== Taxonomy ==
This species belongs to the striatus species group. The defining characters of this group include the absence of setae on the disc of the pronotum and scales or flattened, adpressed setae on the propygidium and usually also the pygidium.

== Description ==
Adults reach a length of about 5.3–7 mm (0.21–0.28 in). The colour of the body is variable. They may be completely black, but sometimes the elytra and abdomen are reddish brown to reddish yellow with the head still black. The legs are reddish brown and the antennae yellowish brown.
