= Liparetrus minor =

Scientific classification
- Kingdom: Animalia
- Phylum: Arthropoda
- Clade: Pancrustacea
- Class: Insecta
- Order: Coleoptera
- Suborder: Polyphaga
- Infraorder: Scarabaeiformia
- Family: Scarabaeidae
- Genus: Liparetrus
- Species: L. minor

Binomial name
- Liparetrus minor Blackburn, 1905

Species of beetle

Liparetrus minor is a species of beetle of the family Scarabaeidae. It is found in Australia (Northern Territory, Queensland).

== Taxonomy ==
This species belongs to the monticola species group.

== Description ==
Adults reach a length of about 3.5–4 mm (0.14–0.16 in). The clypeus is yellowish brown or black, while the frons is dark reddish brown to black. The pronotum is pale yellowish brown, reddish brown or black and the elytra are pale yellowish brown and sometimes darkened around the scutellum and on the sutural edge. The abdomen is yellowish brown or black.
