= Liparetrus wanamarus =

Scientific classification
- Kingdom: Animalia
- Phylum: Arthropoda
- Clade: Pancrustacea
- Class: Insecta
- Order: Coleoptera
- Suborder: Polyphaga
- Infraorder: Scarabaeiformia
- Family: Scarabaeidae
- Genus: Liparetrus
- Species: L. wanamarus

Binomial name
- Liparetrus wanamarus Britton, 1980

Species of beetle

Liparetrus wanamarus is a species of beetle of the family Scarabaeidae. It is found in Australia.

== Taxonomy ==
This species belongs to the fulvohirtus species group. The defining characters of this group include the presence of setae on the discs of the pronotum and elytra.

== Description ==
Adults reach a length of about 6.5 mm (0.26 in). The head and pronotum are black, while the elytra are reddish brown with the lateral and basal margins darkened. The abdomen and ventral surface are dark reddish brown to black.
