= Liparetrus cinctipennis =

Scientific classification
- Kingdom: Animalia
- Phylum: Arthropoda
- Clade: Pancrustacea
- Class: Insecta
- Order: Coleoptera
- Suborder: Polyphaga
- Infraorder: Scarabaeiformia
- Family: Scarabaeidae
- Genus: Liparetrus
- Species: L. cinctipennis

Binomial name
- Liparetrus cinctipennis Blackburn, 1905

Species of beetle

Liparetrus cinctipennis is a species of beetle of the family Scarabaeidae. It is found in Australia (Western Australia).

== Taxonomy ==
This species belongs to the lanaticollis species group. The defining characters of this group include the absence of setae on the disc of the elytra, Furthermore, the base and apex of the elytra are usually darker than the disc.

== Description ==
Adults reach a length of about 5.5–7 mm (0.22–0.28 in). The body is black, but the elytra are pale yellowish brown with black margins. Furthermore, the tibiae, tarsi and antennae are reddish brown.
