= Liparetrus andersoni =

Scientific classification
- Kingdom: Animalia
- Phylum: Arthropoda
- Clade: Pancrustacea
- Class: Insecta
- Order: Coleoptera
- Suborder: Polyphaga
- Infraorder: Scarabaeiformia
- Family: Scarabaeidae
- Genus: Liparetrus
- Species: L. andersoni

Binomial name
- Liparetrus andersoni Britton, 1980

Species of beetle

Liparetrus andersoni is a species of beetle of the family Scarabaeidae. It is found in Australia (Western Australia).

== Taxonomy ==
This species belongs to the fulvohirtus species group. The defining characters of this group include the presence of setae on the discs of the pronotum and elytra.

== Description ==
Adults reach a length of about 8 mm (0.31 in). The head, pronotum and ventral surface are black, while the abdomen is dark brown dorsally, but becoming reddish towards the apex. The antennae are pale reddish brown with the apical half of the club black.
