= Liparetrus kungarus =

Scientific classification
- Kingdom: Animalia
- Phylum: Arthropoda
- Clade: Pancrustacea
- Class: Insecta
- Order: Coleoptera
- Suborder: Polyphaga
- Infraorder: Scarabaeiformia
- Family: Scarabaeidae
- Genus: Liparetrus
- Species: L. kungarus

Binomial name
- Liparetrus kungarus Britton, 1980

Species of beetle

Liparetrus kungarus is a species of beetle of the family Scarabaeidae. It is found in Australia (Western Australia).

== Taxonomy ==
This species belongs to the gracilipes species group. The defining characters of this group include the absence of setae on the discs of the pronotum and elytra, while the pronotum is either without setae on the anterior margin or with only a few setae on each side.

== Description ==
Adults reach a length of about 9 mm (0.35 in). The head is black, while the pronotum, abdomen and ventral surface are brown or dark brown. The elytra are light yellowish brown with a black basal area and the legs are dark reddish brown.
