= Liparetrus ater =

Scientific classification
- Kingdom: Animalia
- Phylum: Arthropoda
- Clade: Pancrustacea
- Class: Insecta
- Order: Coleoptera
- Suborder: Polyphaga
- Infraorder: Scarabaeiformia
- Family: Scarabaeidae
- Genus: Liparetrus
- Species: L. ater

Binomial name
- Liparetrus ater MacLeay, 1886

Synonyms
- Liparetrus nitidipennis MacLeay, 1886

Species of beetle

Liparetrus ater is a species of beetle of the family Scarabaeidae. It is found in Australia (South Australia, New South Wales, Victoria, Queensland).

== Taxonomy ==
This species belongs to the fulvohirtus species group. The defining characters of this group include the presence of setae on the discs of the pronotum and elytra.

== Description ==
Adults reach a length of about 7–10 mm (0.28–0.39 in). The head, pronotum, ventral surface and abdomen are black and the elytra are dark reddish brown, with the base, as well as the lateral and apical margins darkened.
