= Liparetrus confusus =

Scientific classification
- Kingdom: Animalia
- Phylum: Arthropoda
- Clade: Pancrustacea
- Class: Insecta
- Order: Coleoptera
- Suborder: Polyphaga
- Infraorder: Scarabaeiformia
- Family: Scarabaeidae
- Genus: Liparetrus
- Species: L. confusus

Binomial name
- Liparetrus confusus Blackburn, 1912

Species of beetle

Liparetrus confusus is a species of beetle of the family Scarabaeidae. It is found in Australia (Victoria, New South Wales).

== Taxonomy ==
This species belongs to the ferrugineus species group.

== Description ==
Adults reach a length of about 5.5–7.5 mm (0.22–0.30 in). The head, pronotum, scutellum, abdomen and ventral surface are black and the elytra are reddish brown with a black basal margin. The legs are black and the antennae are dark reddish brown to black.
