= Liparetrus globulus =

Scientific classification
- Kingdom: Animalia
- Phylum: Arthropoda
- Clade: Pancrustacea
- Class: Insecta
- Order: Coleoptera
- Suborder: Polyphaga
- Infraorder: Scarabaeiformia
- Family: Scarabaeidae
- Genus: Liparetrus
- Species: L. globulus

Binomial name
- Liparetrus globulus MacLeay, 1886

Synonyms
- Liparetrus mysticus Blackburn, 1889

Species of beetle

Liparetrus globulus is a species of beetle of the family Scarabaeidae. It is found in Australia (New South Wales, South Australia, Australian Capital Territory, Victoria).

== Taxonomy ==
This species belongs to the rufipennis species group. The defining characters of this group include the absence of setae and scales on the disc of the pronotum.

== Description ==
Adults reach a length of about 4–5 mm (0.16–0.20 in). The frons is dark reddish brown, and the rest of the body (including the legs) is pale yellowish brown.
