= Liparetrus asper =

Scientific classification
- Kingdom: Animalia
- Phylum: Arthropoda
- Clade: Pancrustacea
- Class: Insecta
- Order: Coleoptera
- Suborder: Polyphaga
- Infraorder: Scarabaeiformia
- Family: Scarabaeidae
- Genus: Liparetrus
- Species: L. asper

Binomial name
- Liparetrus asper MacLeay, 1886

Synonyms
- Liparetrus spretus Blackburn, 1892

Species of beetle

Liparetrus asper is a species of beetle of the family Scarabaeidae. It is found in Australia (New South Wales, Australian Capital Territory, Victoria, Queensland).

== Taxonomy ==
This species belongs to the atratus species group. The defining characters of this group include the absence of scales on the clypeus, frons, pronotum and abdomen.

== Description ==
Adults reach a length of about 6.5–9 mm (0.26–0.35 in). The body is black, with dark brown to black legs and reddish tarsi.
