= Liparetrus bakeri =

Scientific classification
- Kingdom: Animalia
- Phylum: Arthropoda
- Clade: Pancrustacea
- Class: Insecta
- Order: Coleoptera
- Suborder: Polyphaga
- Infraorder: Scarabaeiformia
- Family: Scarabaeidae
- Genus: Liparetrus
- Species: L. bakeri

Binomial name
- Liparetrus bakeri Britton, 1980

Species of beetle

Liparetrus bakeri is a species of beetle of the family Scarabaeidae. It is found in Australia (Western Australia).

== Taxonomy ==
This species belongs to the discoidalis species group. The defining characters of this group include the pronotum with setae, but with scales on the disc.

== Description ==
Adults reach a length of about 6 mm (0.24 in). The head, pronotum, abdomen and ventral surface are black, while the elytra are yellowish brown with the lateral and sutural margins and the basal area black. The legs are mostly black and the antennae are yellowish with a black club.
