= Liparetrus nigrifrons =

Scientific classification
- Kingdom: Animalia
- Phylum: Arthropoda
- Clade: Pancrustacea
- Class: Insecta
- Order: Coleoptera
- Suborder: Polyphaga
- Infraorder: Scarabaeiformia
- Family: Scarabaeidae
- Genus: Liparetrus
- Species: L. nigrifrons

Binomial name
- Liparetrus nigrifrons Britton, 1980

Species of beetle

Liparetrus nigrifrons is a species of beetle of the family Scarabaeidae. It is found in Australia (Western Australia).

== Taxonomy ==
This species belongs to the gracilipes species group. The defining characters of this group include the absence of setae on the discs of the pronotum and elytra, while the pronotum is either without setae on the anterior margin or with only a few setae on each side.

== Description ==
Adults reach a length of about 8 mm (0.31 in). The clypeus is black or reddish brown anteriorly and the frons is black or dark reddish brown. The pronotum is bright reddish brown, but brown on the anterior margin.
