= Liparetrus jubatus =

Scientific classification
- Kingdom: Animalia
- Phylum: Arthropoda
- Clade: Pancrustacea
- Class: Insecta
- Order: Coleoptera
- Suborder: Polyphaga
- Infraorder: Scarabaeiformia
- Family: Scarabaeidae
- Genus: Liparetrus
- Species: L. jubatus

Binomial name
- Liparetrus jubatus Britton, 1980

Species of beetle

Liparetrus jubatus is a species of beetle of the family Scarabaeidae. It is found in Australia (Western Australia).

== Taxonomy ==
This species belongs to the dixoni species group. The defining characters of this group include the covering of broad scales on the clypeus, frons, pronotum and abdomen.

== Description ==
Adults reach a length of about 6.5 mm (0.26 in). The body is completely black except for a part of the antennae and the tarsi which are reddish brown.
