= Liparetrus suavis =

Scientific classification
- Kingdom: Animalia
- Phylum: Arthropoda
- Clade: Pancrustacea
- Class: Insecta
- Order: Coleoptera
- Suborder: Polyphaga
- Infraorder: Scarabaeiformia
- Family: Scarabaeidae
- Genus: Liparetrus
- Species: L. suavis

Binomial name
- Liparetrus suavis Blackburn, 1889

Species of beetle

Liparetrus suavis is a species of beetle of the family Scarabaeidae. It is found in Australia (South Australia, Western Australia).

== Taxonomy ==
This species belongs to the alienus species group. The defining characters of this group include setae on the disc of the pronotum and the disc of the elytra.

== Description ==
Adults reach a length of about 4.5–6 mm (0.18–0.24 in). The head, pronotum, abdomen and ventral surface are black, while the scutellum is black with reddish edges. The elytra are brownish yellow, the legs reddish brown or dark brown and the antennae yellowish brown.
