= Liparetrus squamipennis =

Scientific classification
- Kingdom: Animalia
- Phylum: Arthropoda
- Clade: Pancrustacea
- Class: Insecta
- Order: Coleoptera
- Suborder: Polyphaga
- Infraorder: Scarabaeiformia
- Family: Scarabaeidae
- Genus: Liparetrus
- Species: L. squamipennis

Binomial name
- Liparetrus squamipennis Britton, 1980

Species of beetle

Liparetrus squamipennis is a species of beetle of the family Scarabaeidae. It is found in Australia (Western Australia).

== Taxonomy ==
This species belongs to the nudipennis species group. The defining characters of this group include the dense covering of scales on the pronotum and abdomen.

== Description ==
Adults reach a length of about 6 mm (0.24 in). The head, pronotum, abdomen and ventral surface are black, while the elytra are bright reddish brown, with the basal area black. The legs are reddish brown to piceous and the antennae are pale reddish yellow with the club infuscate.
