= Liparetrus medius =

Scientific classification
- Kingdom: Animalia
- Phylum: Arthropoda
- Clade: Pancrustacea
- Class: Insecta
- Order: Coleoptera
- Suborder: Polyphaga
- Infraorder: Scarabaeiformia
- Family: Scarabaeidae
- Genus: Liparetrus
- Species: L. medius

Binomial name
- Liparetrus medius Britton, 1980

Species of beetle

Liparetrus medius is a species of beetle of the family Scarabaeidae. It is found in Australia (Northern Territory).

== Taxonomy ==
This species belongs to the flavus species group. The defining characters of this group include the absence of obvious setae on the disc of the pronotum, the glabrous or setate (but without scales) propygidium and pygidium, the elongate elytra and the pale yellowish brown colour of the body.

== Description ==
Adults reach a length of about 7.5–8 mm (0.30–0.31 in). The pronotum is uniformly punctured and only has setae on the lateral edges. The elytra have sparse, short, yellowish setae at the apical margins.
