= Liparetrus malara =

Scientific classification
- Kingdom: Animalia
- Phylum: Arthropoda
- Clade: Pancrustacea
- Class: Insecta
- Order: Coleoptera
- Suborder: Polyphaga
- Infraorder: Scarabaeiformia
- Family: Scarabaeidae
- Genus: Liparetrus
- Species: L. malara

Binomial name
- Liparetrus malara Britton, 1959

Species of beetle

Liparetrus malara is a species of beetle of the family Scarabaeidae. It is found in Australia (Western Australia).

== Taxonomy ==
This species belongs to the rufipennis species group. The defining characters of this group include the absence of setae and scales on the disc of the pronotum.

== Description ==
Adults reach a length of about 9–12 mm (0.35–0.47 in). The head, pronotum, abdomen and ventral surface are black, while the elytra are reddish brown or black. The antennae are yellowish, with the club partly black.
