= Liparetrus ithonus =

Scientific classification
- Kingdom: Animalia
- Phylum: Arthropoda
- Clade: Pancrustacea
- Class: Insecta
- Order: Coleoptera
- Suborder: Polyphaga
- Infraorder: Scarabaeiformia
- Family: Scarabaeidae
- Genus: Liparetrus
- Species: L. ithonus

Binomial name
- Liparetrus ithonus Britton, 1980

Species of beetle

Liparetrus ithonus is a species of beetle of the family Scarabaeidae. It is found in Australia (Western Australia).

== Taxonomy ==
This species belongs to the gracilipes species group. The defining characters of this group include the absence of setae on the discs of the pronotum and elytra, while the pronotum is either without setae on the anterior margin or with only a few setae on each side.

== Description ==
Adults reach a length of about 7–9 mm (0.28–0.35 in). Males have a black head, pronotum and elytra and the abdomen is completely black or has a reddish pygidium. In females, the posterior half of the pronotum is reddish, the elytra are yellowish brown and the apical half of the abdomen is pale reddish brown. In both sexes, the ventral surface is dark brown to black and the legs are reddish brown to dark brown.
