= Liparetrus demarzi =

Scientific classification
- Kingdom: Animalia
- Phylum: Arthropoda
- Clade: Pancrustacea
- Class: Insecta
- Order: Coleoptera
- Suborder: Polyphaga
- Infraorder: Scarabaeiformia
- Family: Scarabaeidae
- Genus: Liparetrus
- Species: L. demarzi

Binomial name
- Liparetrus demarzi Britton, 1959

Species of beetle

Liparetrus demarzi is a species of beetle of the family Scarabaeidae. It is found in Australia (Northern Territory).

== Taxonomy ==
This species belongs to the lanaticollis species group. The defining characters of this group include the absence of setae on the disc of the elytra, Furthermore, the base and apex of the elytra are usually darker than the disc.

== Description ==
Adults reach a length of about 4 mm (0.16 in). The clypeus is reddish brown, the frons dark brown and the pronotum yellowish brown with the anterior and posterior edges darkened. The scutellum is yellowish with darkened edges and the elytra, abdomen, ventral thorax, legs and antennae are pale yellowish brown.
