= Liparetrus analis =

Scientific classification
- Kingdom: Animalia
- Phylum: Arthropoda
- Clade: Pancrustacea
- Class: Insecta
- Order: Coleoptera
- Suborder: Polyphaga
- Infraorder: Scarabaeiformia
- Family: Scarabaeidae
- Genus: Liparetrus
- Species: L. analis

Binomial name
- Liparetrus analis Blackburn, 1888

Species of beetle

Liparetrus analis is a species of beetle of the family Scarabaeidae. It is found in Australia.

== Taxonomy ==
This species belongs to the concolor species group. The defining characters of this group include the absence of setae on the discs of the pronotum and elytra, while the pronotum has a fringe of setae along the anterior margin.

== Description ==
Adults reach a length of about 6 mm (0.24 in). The head, pronotum and elytra are shining black, while the abdomen is pale reddish yellow. The remainder of the ventral surface and the legs are brown.
