= Liparetrus perkinsi =

Scientific classification
- Kingdom: Animalia
- Phylum: Arthropoda
- Clade: Pancrustacea
- Class: Insecta
- Order: Coleoptera
- Suborder: Polyphaga
- Infraorder: Scarabaeiformia
- Family: Scarabaeidae
- Genus: Liparetrus
- Species: L. perkinsi

Binomial name
- Liparetrus perkinsi Blackburn, 1905

Species of beetle

Liparetrus perkinsi is a species of beetle of the family Scarabaeidae. It is found in Australia (Queensland, South Australia).

== Taxonomy ==
This species belongs to the rufipennis species group. The defining characters of this group include the absence of setae and scales on the disc of the pronotum.

== Description ==
Adults reach a length of about 6–6.5 mm (0.24–0.26 in). They have a black body, with the pronotum slightly iridescent. The elytra are pale yellowish brown with a black basal area. The antennae are pale yellowish brown. The hind legs are dark brown, while all other legs are reddish brown.
