= Liparetrus obesus =

Scientific classification
- Kingdom: Animalia
- Phylum: Arthropoda
- Clade: Pancrustacea
- Class: Insecta
- Order: Coleoptera
- Suborder: Polyphaga
- Infraorder: Scarabaeiformia
- Family: Scarabaeidae
- Genus: Liparetrus
- Species: L. obesus

Binomial name
- Liparetrus obesus Britton, 1980

Species of beetle

Liparetrus obesus is a species of beetle of the family Scarabaeidae. It is found in Australia (Western Australia).

== Taxonomy ==
This species belongs to the lanaticollis species group. The defining characters of this group include the absence of setae on the disc of the elytra, Furthermore, the base and apex of the elytra are usually darker than the disc.

== Description ==
Adults reach a length of about 8 mm (0.31 in). The body is black, but the abdomen is so densely clothed with pale yellowish white scales that the ground colour is hardly visible. The legs are dark brown to black.
