= Liparetrus mulurus =

Scientific classification
- Kingdom: Animalia
- Phylum: Arthropoda
- Clade: Pancrustacea
- Class: Insecta
- Order: Coleoptera
- Suborder: Polyphaga
- Infraorder: Scarabaeiformia
- Family: Scarabaeidae
- Genus: Liparetrus
- Species: L. mulurus

Binomial name
- Liparetrus mulurus Britton, 1959

Species of beetle

Liparetrus mulurus is a species of beetle of the family Scarabaeidae. It is found in Australia (Western Australia).

== Taxonomy ==
This species belongs to the striatus species group. The defining characters of this group include the absence of setae on the disc of the pronotum and scales or flattened, adpressed setae on the propygidium and usually also the pygidium.

== Description ==
Adults reach a length of about 4.5–6 mm (0.18–0.24 in). The head, pronotum, scutellum, abdomen and ventral surface are black, while the elytra are dark reddish brown or black and the antennae are dark reddish brown with a black club.
