= Liparetrus pectinatus =

Scientific classification
- Kingdom: Animalia
- Phylum: Arthropoda
- Clade: Pancrustacea
- Class: Insecta
- Order: Coleoptera
- Suborder: Polyphaga
- Infraorder: Scarabaeiformia
- Family: Scarabaeidae
- Genus: Liparetrus
- Species: L. pectinatus

Binomial name
- Liparetrus pectinatus Britton, 1980

Species of beetle

Liparetrus pectinatus is a species of beetle of the family Scarabaeidae. It is found in Australia (Australian Capital Territory, New South Wales, Victoria).

== Taxonomy ==
This species belongs to the concolor species group. The defining characters of this group include the absence of setae on the discs of the pronotum and elytra, while the pronotum has a fringe of setae along the anterior margin.

== Description ==
Adults reach a length of about 8–9 mm (0.31–0.35 in). The head and pronotum are black, while the elytra are reddish brown, but darkened at the base. The abdomen and ventral surface are dark brown or black.
