= Liparetrus pezus =

Scientific classification
- Kingdom: Animalia
- Phylum: Arthropoda
- Clade: Pancrustacea
- Class: Insecta
- Order: Coleoptera
- Suborder: Polyphaga
- Infraorder: Scarabaeiformia
- Family: Scarabaeidae
- Genus: Liparetrus
- Species: L. pezus

Binomial name
- Liparetrus pezus Britton, 1980

Species of beetle

Liparetrus pezus is a species of beetle of the family Scarabaeidae. It is found in Australia (Western Australia).

== Taxonomy ==
This species belongs to the rufipennis species group. The defining characters of this group include the absence of setae and scales on the disc of the pronotum.

== Description ==
Adults reach a length of about 10 mm (0.39 in). The head, pronotum, abdomen and ventral surface are black and the legs are mostly dark brown to black. The antennae are yellowish brown with the tips of the lamellae dark brown. The elytra are yellowish brown with the base, as well as the lateral and apical areas dark brown to black.
