= Liparetrus hattanus =

Scientific classification
- Kingdom: Animalia
- Phylum: Arthropoda
- Clade: Pancrustacea
- Class: Insecta
- Order: Coleoptera
- Suborder: Polyphaga
- Infraorder: Scarabaeiformia
- Family: Scarabaeidae
- Genus: Liparetrus
- Species: L. hattanus

Binomial name
- Liparetrus hattanus Britton, 1980

Species of beetle

Liparetrus hattanus is a species of beetle of the family Scarabaeidae. It is found in Australia (Victoria).

== Taxonomy ==
This species belongs to the discoidalis species group. The defining characters of this group include the pronotum with setae, but with scales on the disc.

== Description ==
Adults reach a length of about 6.5 mm (0.26 in). The head is black, while the remainder of the body and legs are dark reddish brown.
