= Liparetrus imbricatus =

Scientific classification
- Kingdom: Animalia
- Phylum: Arthropoda
- Clade: Pancrustacea
- Class: Insecta
- Order: Coleoptera
- Suborder: Polyphaga
- Infraorder: Scarabaeiformia
- Family: Scarabaeidae
- Genus: Liparetrus
- Species: L. imbricatus

Binomial name
- Liparetrus imbricatus Britton, 1980

Species of beetle

Liparetrus imbricatus is a species of beetle of the family Scarabaeidae. It is found in Australia (South Australia).

== Taxonomy ==
This species belongs to the squamiger species group. The defining characters of this group include the presence of setae on the disc of the pronotum.

== Description ==
Adults reach a length of about 7.2 mm (0.28 in). The clypeus and elytra are dark reddish brown, the frons is dark brown and the ventral surface, abdomen and legs are reddish brown. The antennae are yellowish brown.
