= Liparetrus opacicollis =

Scientific classification
- Kingdom: Animalia
- Phylum: Arthropoda
- Clade: Pancrustacea
- Class: Insecta
- Order: Coleoptera
- Suborder: Polyphaga
- Infraorder: Scarabaeiformia
- Family: Scarabaeidae
- Genus: Liparetrus
- Species: L. opacicollis

Binomial name
- Liparetrus opacicollis MacLeay, 1886

Synonyms
- Liparetrus clypealis Lea, 1924

Species of beetle

Liparetrus opacicollis is a species of beetle of the family Scarabaeidae. It is found in Australia (Western Australia).

== Taxonomy ==
This species belongs to the rufipennis species group. The defining characters of this group include the absence of setae and scales on the disc of the pronotum.

== Description ==
Adults reach a length of about 5.5–7 mm (0.22–0.28 in). The head and pronotum are black, while the ventral surface is brown, the abdomen reddish brown or brown and the elytra light yellowish brown with a black basal area.
