= Liparetrus atratus =

Scientific classification
- Kingdom: Animalia
- Phylum: Arthropoda
- Clade: Pancrustacea
- Class: Insecta
- Order: Coleoptera
- Suborder: Polyphaga
- Infraorder: Scarabaeiformia
- Family: Scarabaeidae
- Genus: Liparetrus
- Species: L. atratus

Binomial name
- Liparetrus atratus Burmeister, 1855

Synonyms
- Liparetrus orthodoxus Lea, 1924; Liparetrus intermedius Lea, 1919; Liparetrus obtusidens MacLeay, 1886; Liparetrus parvidens MacLeay, 1886

Species of beetle

Liparetrus atratus is a species of beetle of the family Scarabaeidae. It is found in Australia (New South Wales, Australian Capital Territory, Queensland, Victoria, Tasmania).

== Taxonomy ==
This species belongs to the atratus species group. The defining characters of this group include the absence of scales on the clypeus, frons, pronotum and abdomen.

== Description ==
Adults reach a length of about 7–10 mm (0.28–0.39 in). The elytra are reddish brown with a black base, or completely black. The rest of the body is black. The legs are also black, but the tarsi are reddish.
