= Liparetrus aethiops =

Scientific classification
- Kingdom: Animalia
- Phylum: Arthropoda
- Clade: Pancrustacea
- Class: Insecta
- Order: Coleoptera
- Suborder: Polyphaga
- Infraorder: Scarabaeiformia
- Family: Scarabaeidae
- Genus: Liparetrus
- Species: L. aethiops

Binomial name
- Liparetrus aethiops Britton, 1980

Species of beetle

Liparetrus aethiops is a species of beetle of the family Scarabaeidae. It is found in Australia (Western Australia).

== Taxonomy ==
This species belongs to the discipennis species group. The defining characters of this group include the presence of long setae on the disc of the elytra (at least towards the base).

== Description ==
Adults reach a length of about 8 mm (0.31 in). The body is black or with dark brown elytra. The antennae and some legs are reddish yellow, while the rest of the legs are dark reddish brown to black.
