= Liparetrus nigricollis =

Scientific classification
- Kingdom: Animalia
- Phylum: Arthropoda
- Clade: Pancrustacea
- Class: Insecta
- Order: Coleoptera
- Suborder: Polyphaga
- Infraorder: Scarabaeiformia
- Family: Scarabaeidae
- Genus: Liparetrus
- Species: L. nigricollis

Binomial name
- Liparetrus nigricollis Hope, 1841

Species of beetle

Liparetrus nigricollis is a species of beetle of the family Scarabaeidae. It is found in Australia (Queensland, Northern Territory).

== Taxonomy ==
This species belongs to the rufipennis species group. The defining characters of this group include the absence of setae and scales on the disc of the pronotum.

== Description ==
Adults reach a length of about 5–8 mm (0.20–0.31 in). The head is black and the pronotum is also black in males, but reddish brown, becoming dark brown towards the anterior margin and with the posterior margin dark brown in females. The elytra and abdomen are reddish brown to brown and the legs are reddish brown.
