= Liparetrus luridipennis =

Scientific classification
- Kingdom: Animalia
- Phylum: Arthropoda
- Clade: Pancrustacea
- Class: Insecta
- Order: Coleoptera
- Suborder: Polyphaga
- Infraorder: Scarabaeiformia
- Family: Scarabaeidae
- Genus: Liparetrus
- Species: L. luridipennis

Binomial name
- Liparetrus luridipennis MacLeay, 1886

Species of beetle

Liparetrus luridipennis is a species of beetle of the family Scarabaeidae. It is found in Australia (Western Australia).

== Taxonomy ==
This species belongs to the luridipennis species group. The defining characters of this group include setae on the disc of the pronotum.

== Description ==
Adults reach a length of about 6–8.5 mm (0.24–0.33 in). The head, pronotum, scutellum, abdomen and ventral surface are black, while the elytra are brownish yellow. The legs, palpi and antennae are reddish brown, the latter with a black club.
