= Liparetrus angulatus =

Scientific classification
- Kingdom: Animalia
- Phylum: Arthropoda
- Clade: Pancrustacea
- Class: Insecta
- Order: Coleoptera
- Suborder: Polyphaga
- Infraorder: Scarabaeiformia
- Family: Scarabaeidae
- Genus: Liparetrus
- Species: L. angulatus

Binomial name
- Liparetrus angulatus MacLeay, 1886

Species of beetle

Liparetrus angulatus is a species of beetle of the family Scarabaeidae. It is found in Australia (New South Wales).

== Taxonomy ==
This species belongs to the capillatus species group. The defining characters of this group include the absence of setae on the disc of the pronotum, although sometimes scales are present.

== Description ==
Adults reach a length of about 7–8 mm (0.28–0.31 in). The head and pronotum are black, while the elytra are reddish brown with a black basal area. The ventral surface and abdomen are black or dark brown and the antennae are reddish with a black club.
