= Caccothryptus yunnanensis =

Scientific classification
- Kingdom: Animalia
- Phylum: Arthropoda
- Clade: Pancrustacea
- Class: Insecta
- Order: Coleoptera
- Suborder: Polyphaga
- Infraorder: Elateriformia
- Family: Limnichidae
- Genus: Caccothryptus
- Species: C. yunnanensis

Binomial name
- Caccothryptus yunnanensis Yoshitomi, 2018

Species of beetle

Caccothryptus yunnanensis is a species of minute marsh-loving beetle in the subfamily Limnichinae. The species was described in 2018 by entomologist Hiroyuki Yoshitomi. Although part of the species group testudo, it shares serrations on its parameres with the compactus-group species C. chayuensis and C. thai; however, C. yunnanesis's parameres are straighter. Specimens were collected across the Chinese provinces of Guizhou and Yunnan.

== Taxonomy ==
The Limnichidae (minute marsh-loving beetle) genus Caccothryptus, within the subfamily Limnichinae, was first described by the entomologist David Sharp in 1902. In 2014, the genus was divided into five species groups by entomologists Carles Hernando and Ignacio Ribera based on similarities in genital shape and some external features. Reclassification and reanalysis of Caccothryptus specimens under the new system brought the total number of species to 20, up from a previous total of seven. One group, named for C. testudo, is distinguished by its separated paramere (part of the external genitalia of males), and—unlike the C. compactus group—the lack of a long longitudinal furrow along the median lobe of the aedeagus (male reproductive organ), alongside a lack of differentiation between the anterior claws on males.

In 2018, a distinct species of the C. testudo group was identified by entomologist Hiroyuki Yoshitomi from specimens collected in southwestern China which displayed novel genital characteristics. This species was named Caccothryptus yunnanensis, after Yunnan, the province where many of the specimens were found. The holotype of the species is a male specimen collected in Xima, Yingjiang County, Yunnan, by the entomologist Yu-Tang Wang in 2014. This is joined by large numbers of paratypes collected by Wang in Xima and several other areas of Yunnan, including Ruili, Mengla, and Daweishan. Three specimens were also collected in Leishan County in Guizhou province.

Despite its presence in the C. testudo group, C. yunnanensis shares the presence of minuscule serrae (saw-like indentation) along the lower margin of the median lobe of the aedeagus with the C. compactus group species C. thai and C. chayuensis.

== Description ==
Caccothryptus beetles are commonly found in piles of dead, water-logged wood located along forest streams. C. yunnanensis has an oblong body, with a total length ranging from 3.90–6.05 mm (0.15–0.24 in), averaging at 5.04 mm (0.20 in). Its elytral width ranges from 2.00–3.13 mm (0.079–0.12 in), with lengths of 3.10–4.85 mm (0.12–0.19 in). These elytra are oblong with wide bases, covered with dense indentations. Its body is shiny and is densely covered with silvery setae of varying lengths, forming irregular zigzag patterns. It has short antennae, only about one-eighth the length of the elytra—about 0.25 mm (0.01 in). It is almost uniformly black except for its brown antennae and legs, while two of its antenna segments and its tarsi are light brown. Its claws on each foreleg are identical in shape and size.

It is distinguished from related species through genital characteristics. It is categorized in the species group C. testudo due to its parameres, which are separated and emarginate (with concave edges that appear notched). Although related to the compactus species C. thai and C. chayuensis due to its median lobe serrae, C. yunnanensis's parameres project straight out instead of curve as seen on the other two species. Additionally, the notches along the underside of the parameres are V-shaped, unlike the deep U-shaped notches of C. thai. It exhibits very minor sexual dimorphism. Females have highly sclerotized (hardened by sclerotin) ovipositors with long, curled spermathecal ducts.
