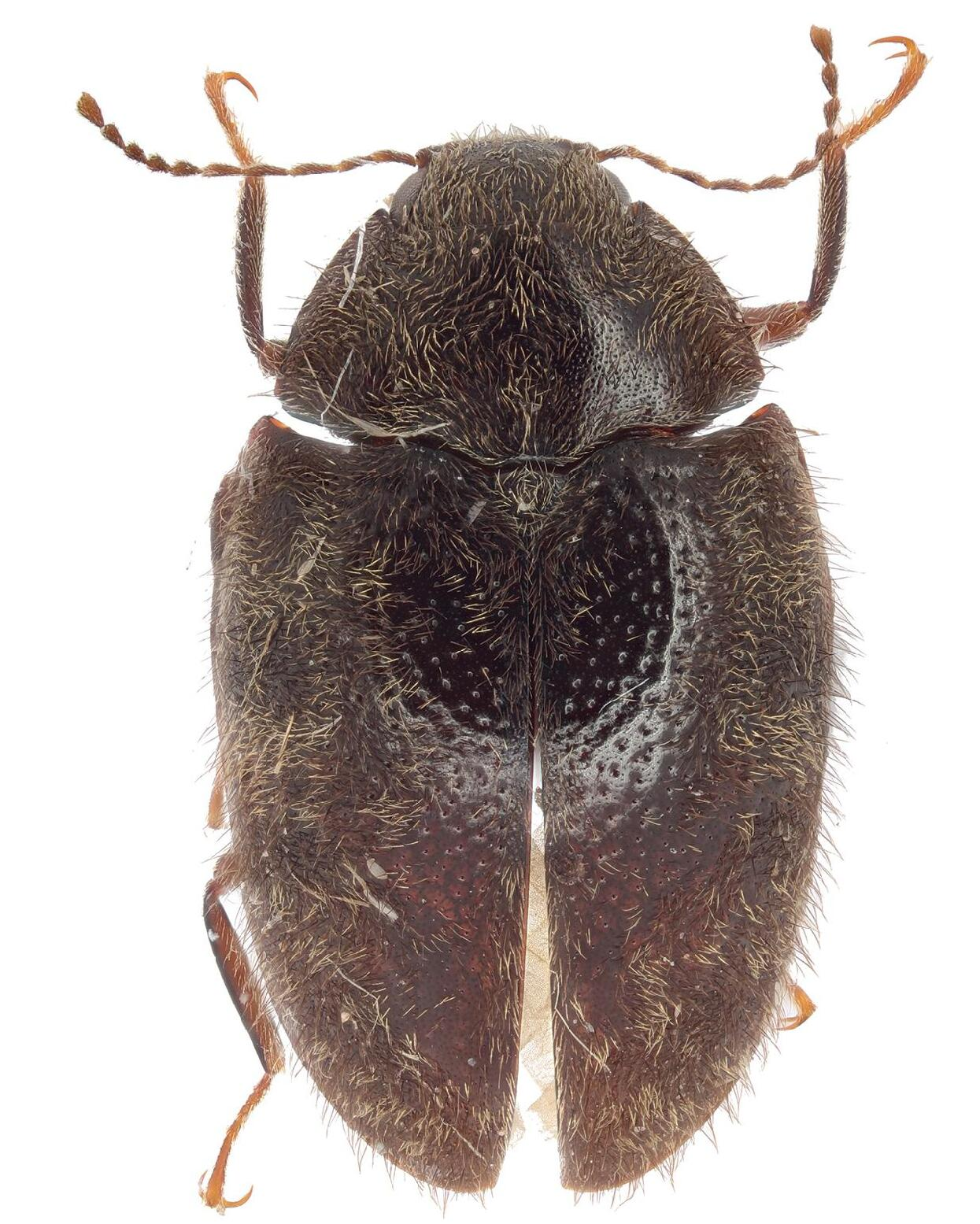

Scientific classification
- Kingdom: Animalia
- Phylum: Arthropoda
- Clade: Pancrustacea
- Class: Insecta
- Order: Coleoptera
- Suborder: Polyphaga
- Infraorder: Elateriformia
- Family: Limnichidae
- Genus: Caccothryptus
- Species: C. abboti

Binomial name
- Caccothryptus abboti Matsumoto, 2021

= Caccothryptus abboti =

Species of beetle

Caccothryptus abboti is a species of minute marsh-loving beetle in the subfamily Limnichinae. The species was described alongside five other Caccothryptus species by Natural History Museum entomologist Keita Matsumoto in 2021, using specimens gathered in 1953 by Harry George Champion in Haldwani, Uttarakhand, in the Himalaya range of northern India. It was distinguished from its original classification of C. testudo due to differences in the shape of its genitalia and grouped in the C. compactus species group. One specimen collected by Champion was identified as the holotype for C. abboti and named for English radio presenter Nick Abbot.

== Taxonomy ==
The Limnichidae (minute marsh-loving beetle) genus Caccothryptus was first described by David Sharp in 1902. Native to southern and eastern Asia, Caccothryptus beetles generally live in forests, inside piles of water-logged dead wood adjacent to small streams. In 2014, the genus was divided into five species groups by entomologists Carles Hernando and Ignacio Ribera based on similarities in genital shape and some external features. This reclassification and reanalysis of Caccothryptus specimens under the new system brought the total number of species to 20, up from a previous total of seven. Further research has brought this count to 37 as of 2026.

One group, named for C. compactus, was identified for the shared innovations of dissimilar front claws on males (with the inner claw being longer and more curved), the presence of glandular pores on only the fourth sternite (abdomen segment), separated parameres (part of the external male genitalia), and a furrow running across the central lobe of the aedeagus. No other Caccothryptus species group has differences between its claws, while the presence of the other features vary between different groups.

A group of Caccothryptus specimens were collected in 1953 by forester Harry George Champion in the Haldwani division of the Kumaon Himalayas, India. These were labeled as C. ripicola and C. testudo, species which George Charles Champion had previously described in 1923. These were stored at the British Natural History Museum in London. In 2021, Natural History Museum entomologist Keita Matsumoto identified six new species from these specimens: C. brendelli, C. arakawae, C. championi, and C. tardarsauceae in the C. testudo species group, and C. larryi and C. abboti in the C. compactus group. One male specimen was labeled as the holotype of Caccothryptus abboti, with no paratypes presented.

Named for English radio presenter Nick Abbot, C. abboti can be distinguished from other C. compactus group species by several features of its aedeagus and parameres: the median lobe of its aedeagus is asymetrical when viewed from below, while its parameres are deeply curved dorsally (on the upper side), with a gentler curve ventrally (on the bottom side) when viewed laterally; a deep U-shaped depression is present between its parameres; and the notches on the end of its parameres are slanted inward and V-shaped.

== Description ==
C. abboti's body is an elongated oval, and dark brown spare for reddish-brown tibia and patches of long setae. These are yellow along the underside and white on the dorsum. Its tarsi are divided into five segments, of increasing length, with the fifth segment as long as the others combined. It has long, narrow, light brown tarsal claws. The beetle's head, smooth and punctured, is slightly retracted into its pronotum, and features eleven-segment antennae.

Its elytra are curved and covered a mix of fine and medium-sized punctures, with a smooth, shiny surface between the punctures, with striae (lines) not clearly visible. They measure 3.22 millimetres (0.127 in) in length and 2.62 millimetres (0.103 in) in width. Its prothorax measures 1.01 millimetres (0.040 in) in length and 2.05 millimetres (0.081 in) in width. The abdomen has five ventrites (externally-visible sternites), convered with long, light yellow setae.

The beetle's genitals display a number of differences from the original classification of C. ripicola, which enabled its classification as a separate species. C. abboti's aedeagus is long and highly sclerotised (hardened by sclerotin)., with an asymmetric apex on the median lobe. No female specimens are known.
