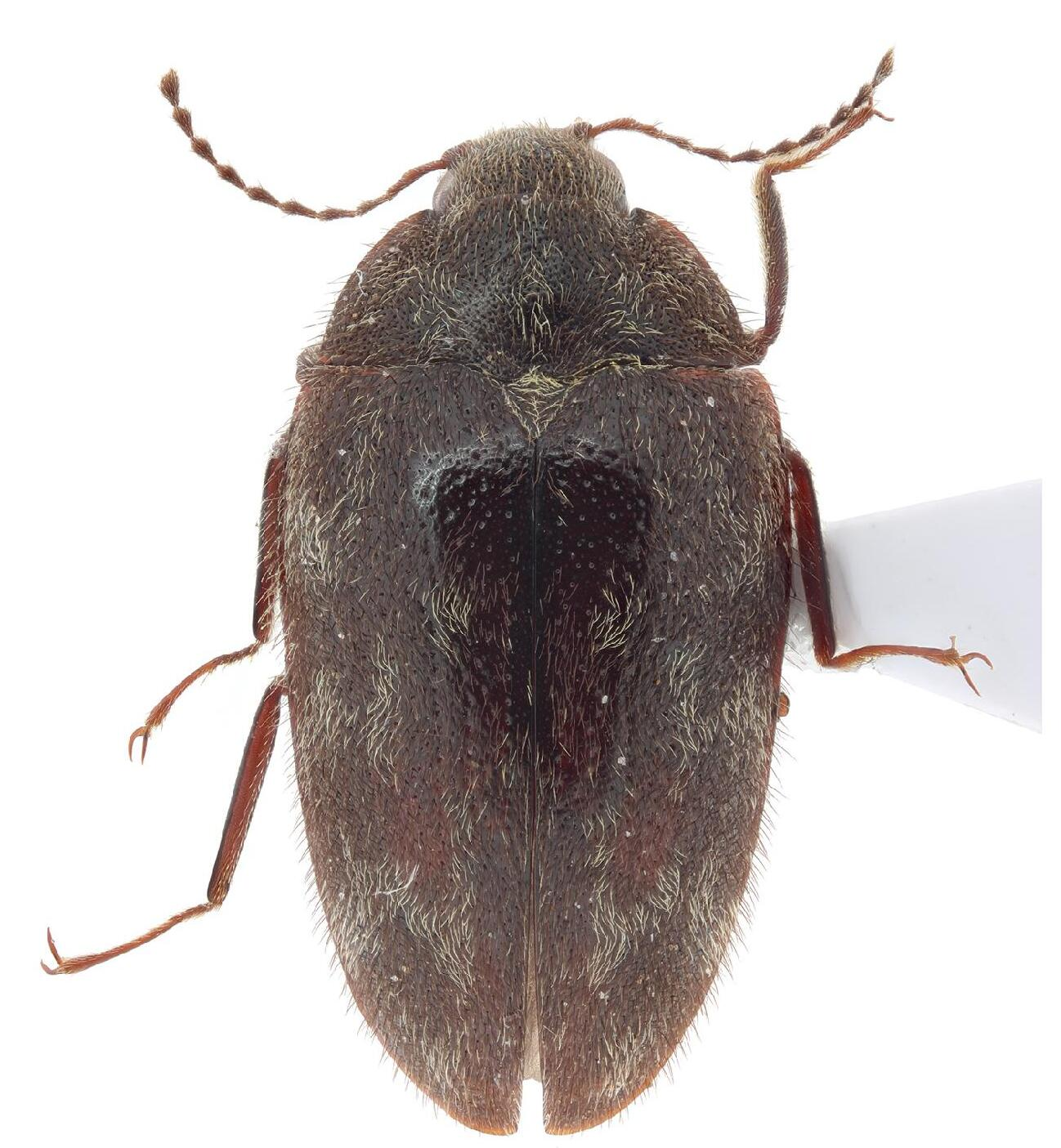
- Damaged C. brendelli specimen

Scientific classification
- Kingdom: Animalia
- Phylum: Arthropoda
- Clade: Pancrustacea
- Class: Insecta
- Order: Coleoptera
- Suborder: Polyphaga
- Infraorder: Elateriformia
- Family: Limnichidae
- Genus: Caccothryptus
- Species: C. brendelli

Binomial name
- Caccothryptus brendelli Matsumoto, 2021

= Caccothryptus brendelli =

Species of beetle

Caccothryptus brendelli is a species of minute marsh-loving beetle in the subfamily Limnichinae. The species was described alongside five other Caccothryptus species by Natural History Museum entomologist Keita Matsumoto in 2021, using specimens gathered by Martin J. D. Brendell (curator of the Coleoptera Department of Entomology at the Natural History Museum, London) in Kathmandu District, Nepal, in 1983. Part of the C. testudo species group, it can be distinguished from related species by genital features such as the presence of a narrow, V-shaped concavity with a rounded end between the parameres (external male genitalia).

== Taxonomy ==
The Limnichidae (minute marsh-loving beetle) genus Caccothryptus was first described by David Sharp in 1902. Native to southern and eastern Asia, Caccothryptus beetles generally live in forests, inside piles of water-logged dead wood adjacent to small streams. In 2014, the genus was divided into five species groups by entomologists Carles Hernando and Ignacio Ribera. This reclassification and reanalysis of Caccothryptus specimens under the new system brought the total number of species to 20, up from a previous total of 7. Further research has brought this count to 37. A group named for C. testudo is distinguished by its separated parameres (part of the external genitalia of males), and—unlike the C. compactus group—the lack of a long longitudinal furrow along the median lobe of the aedeagus (male reproductive organ), alongside a lack of differentiation between the anterior claws on males. Many members of the C. testudo group are native to the Himalayas of Nepal and northern India, although others have been found in China, Vietnam and Thailand.

In 2021, entomologist Keita Matsumoto identified a number of new Caccothryptus species from the collections of the Natural History Museum, London: C. abboti and C. larryi from the C. compactus group, and C. arakawae, C. tardarsauceae, C. championi, and C. brendelli from the C. testudo group. C. brendelli was described from one specimen (the holotype) discovered by Martin J. D. Brendell (the curator of the Coleoptera Department of Entomology at the Natural History Museum) under the bark of a dead tree in Kathmandu District, Nepal, in 1983, and named for him. It can be distinguished from other members of the species group from the slightly pointed tip of the median lobe of the aedeagus when viewed from below; the narrow, V-shaped concavity with a rounded end between the parameres; the bisinuate (double-curved) top surface of the parameres when viewed from the side; and the V-shaped notch at the end of the parameres when viewed from below.

== Description ==
Caccothryptus brendelli has a elongated, oval-shaped body with a convex top. Its body is entirely brown, except for reddish-brown tibiae (penultimate leg segments) and light brown tarsi (final leg segments). The top of the body is covered with dense, long setae, with white setae forming a wavy pattern. The underside also has relatively long setae. The head is slightly protracted into its pronotum (top plate of the prothorax), with a smooth surface interrupted by dense punctures, a feature shared by the pronotum's surface. Its setae-covered antennae have eleven segments, with the top segment being the widest. Its elytra are longer than they are wide— 3.36 by 2.44 millimetres (0.132 by 0.096 in)—and curved, forming a near-right angle at their ends. The elytra have a mix of small-to-medium sized punctures. The scutellum (plate behind the pronotum) is large and somewhat triangular, with fairly straight sides. The tarsal claws are long, narrow, and symmetrical.

The aedeagus is elongated and slightly slcerotised (hardened by sclerotin), with an asymmetrical base. The median lobe of the aedeagus is about two-fifths of the length of the total genitalia, longer than the parameres. The lobe is gently curved on its top side, narrowing to a round point when viewed from the side. The parameres have a V-shaped notch at their tips, and are separated by a long, V-shaped concave structure with a rounded end.
