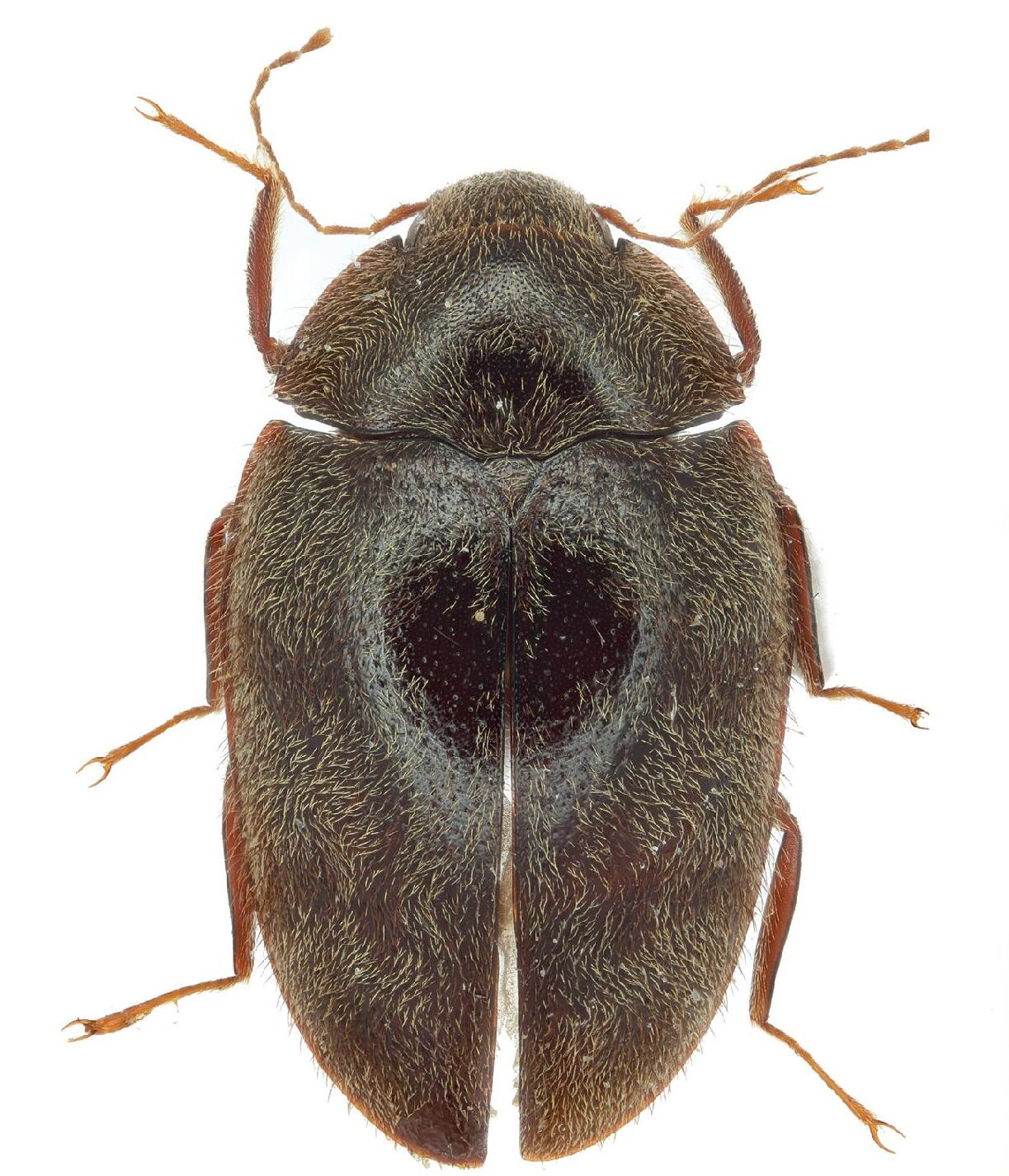

Scientific classification
- Kingdom: Animalia
- Phylum: Arthropoda
- Clade: Pancrustacea
- Class: Insecta
- Order: Coleoptera
- Suborder: Polyphaga
- Infraorder: Elateriformia
- Family: Limnichidae
- Genus: Caccothryptus
- Species: C. championi

Binomial name
- Caccothryptus championi Matsumoto, 2021

= Caccothryptus championi =

Species of beetle

Caccothryptus championi is a species of minute marsh-loving beetle in the subfamily Limnichinae. The species was described alongside five other Caccothryptus species by Natural History Museum entomologist Keita Matsumoto in 2021, using specimens gathered in Haldwani, India. A total of 27 specimens from the British Natural History Museum collection were identified with C. championi, named after botanist Harry George Champion, their collector.

== Taxonomy ==
The Limnichidae (minute marsh-loving beetle) genus Caccothryptus was first described by David Sharp in 1902. Native to southern and eastern Asia, Caccothryptus beetles generally live in forests, inside piles of water-logged dead wood adjacent to small streams. In 2014, the genus was divided into five species groups by Carles Hernando and Ignacio Ribera. This reclassification and reanalysis of Caccothryptus specimens under the new system brought the total number of species to 20, up from a previous total of 7. Further research has brought this count to 37. A group named for C. testudo is distinguished by its separated parameres (part of the external genitalia of males), and—unlike the C. compactus group—the lack of a long longitudinal furrow along the median lobe of the aedeagus (male reproductive organ), alongside a lack of differentiation between the anterior claws on males. Many members of the C. testudo group are native to the Himalayas of Nepal and northern India, although others have been found in China, Vietnam and Thailand.

In 2021, entomologist Keita Matsumoto identified a number of new Caccothryptus species from the collections of the Natural History Museum, London: C. abboti and C. larryi from the C. compactus group, and C. brendelli, C. arakawae, C. tardarsauceae, and C. championi from the C. testudo group. C. championi was described from 27 specimens collected around Haldwani, Uttarakhand, India: 24 of these, including the holotype, were collected by botanist Harry George Champion in 1953, while 2 specimens were collected by Harry George Champion and entomologist George Charles Champion in 1923. The latter 2 specimens were, at the time, identified as C. ripicola, another species now classified as part of the C. testudo group. The species was named for Harry George Champion, their collector.

C. championi can be distinguished from other members of the C. testudo group by the oval shape of the median lobe of the aedeagus when viewed from below, the elongated and pointed concavity between the parameres, the gradual narrowing of the top part of the parameres towards their tip (with a small bump present near the apex), and the V-shaped notch on the paramere tips when viewed from below.

== Description ==
C. championi's body is dark brown safe for reddish-brown tibia and patches of long setae, yellow along the underside and white on the dorsum. Its tarsi are divided into five segments, of increasing length, with the fifth segment as long as the others combined. It has long, narrow, light brown tarsal claws. The beetle's head, smooth and punctured, is slightly retracted into its pronotum, and features eleven-segment antennae. Little sexual dimorphism exists between the male and female specimens, beyond a longer fifth abdominal ventrite on the female.

The beetle's genitals display a number of differences from the original classification of C. ripicola, which enabled its classification as a separate species. C. championi has an ovoid apex on its median lobe. Its parameres narrow when viewed from the side, with V-shaped notches along their bottom and a slight bump on their side near the apex. Between the parameres is a deep, narrow depression forming a pointed V-shape. Females have long ovipositors.
