= Caccothryptus wakaharai =

Scientific classification
- Kingdom: Animalia
- Phylum: Arthropoda
- Clade: Pancrustacea
- Class: Insecta
- Order: Coleoptera
- Suborder: Polyphaga
- Infraorder: Elateriformia
- Family: Limnichidae
- Genus: Caccothryptus
- Species: C. wakaharai

Binomial name
- Caccothryptus wakaharai Yoshitomi and Hájek, 2026

Species of beetle

Caccothryptus wakaharai is a species of minute marsh-loving beetle in the subfamily Limnichinae. It was discovered by a field expedition in Laos and described in 2026 by entomologists Hiroyuki Yoshitomi and Jiří Hájek. Hiroyuki Wakahara, one of the expedition's supporters. Part of the C. testudo species group within the Caccothryptus genus, it is most closely related to C. ripicola and C. auratus, but can be distinguished by the shallow notches on the parameres (external male genitalia) and their pointed tips.

== Taxonomy ==
Caccothryptus, a genus of minute marsh-loving beetle in the subfamily Limnichinae, was first described by entomologist David Sharp in 1902. Native to southern and eastern Asia, Caccothryptus beetles generally live in forests, inside piles of water-logged dead wood adjacent to small streams. In 2014, the genus was divided into five species groups by entomologists Carles Hernando and Ignacio Ribera based on differences in genital shape and some external features. This reclassification and reanalysis of Caccothryptus specimens under the new system brought the total number of species to 20, up from a previous total of seven. Further research has brought this count to 37. One group, named for C. testudo, is distinguished by its separated parameres (part of the external genitalia of males), and—unlike the C. compactus group—the lack of a long longitudinal furrow along the median lobe of the aedeagus (male reproductive organ), alongside a lack of differentiation between the anterior claws on males.

Caccothryptus wakaharai was described by entomologists Hiroyuki Yoshitomi and Jiří Hájek in 2026 alongside two other Caccothryptus species from China and Indonesia, and classified as part of the C. testudo group. It was described using three specimens—a male holotype and two female paratypes—discovered by Yoshitomi near Nam Chat, Laos, in 2018, and named for Hiroyuki Wakahara, who supported the field investigation into Laos. All the specimens were found on a large, wet stone adjacent to a shallow stream. After C. maculosus, discovered in 1925, it is the second known Caccothryptus species discovered in Laos. It most closely resembles C. ripicola and C. auratus, but differs in the shape of its parameres: they have shallow, U-shaped notches on their tips, while the tips themselves are more pointed.

== Description ==
Caccothryptus wakaharai has a black, oblong body with dark brown legs and antennae, covered with silvery setae of varying lengths. The three specimens have a total body length ranging from 3.45 to 3.65 millimetres (0.136 to 0.144 in). C wakaharai's head and pronotum (top plate of the prothorax) are covered densely with small punctures, while its antennae are short, reaching only to the rear end of the pronotum. Its elytra, ranging from 2.80 to 2.95 millimetres (0.110 to 0.116 in) in length and 2.20 to 2.33 millimetres (0.087 to 0.092 in) in width, are widest at their middles. Slightly curved along their edges, the elytra are covered in a small amount of fine punctures and golden setae pressed closely to the surface, forming zigzag patterns.

C. wakharai lacks pronounced sexual dimorphism. The 8th and 9th sternites (segmenst of the abdomen) on males are slightly sclerotized (hardened by sclerotin), with the former U-shaped and the latter elongated. The aedeagus is short, about 1.1 millimetres (0.043 in) long, and gently curves downwards at the tip. The tip of its median lobe is sharply pointed when viewed from the side, with small denticles around its edges. The parameres have shallow, U-shaped notches at their ends, and pointed tips. Females have a highly sclerotized ovipositor.
