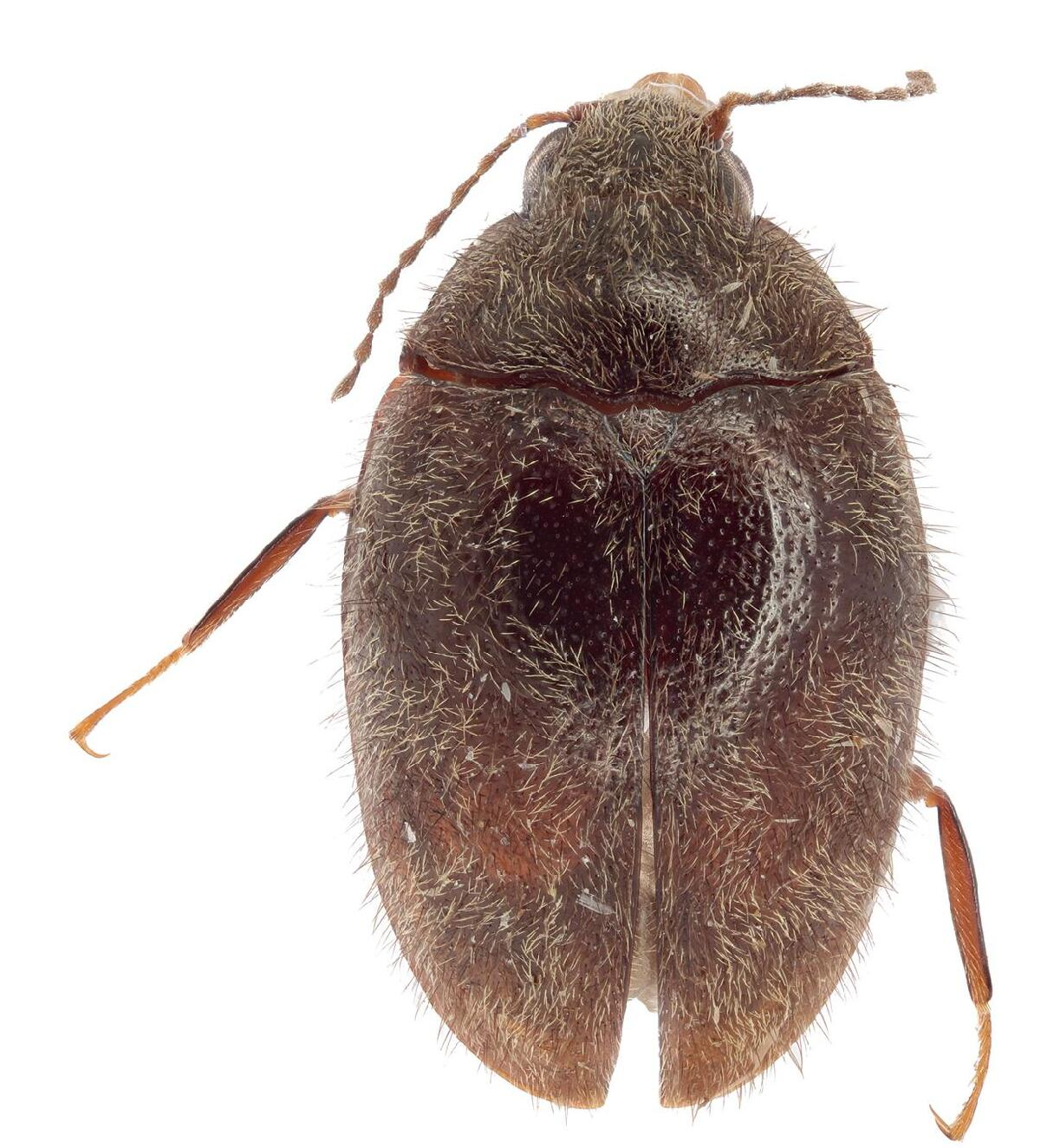
- Damaged C. larryi specimen

Scientific classification
- Kingdom: Animalia
- Phylum: Arthropoda
- Clade: Pancrustacea
- Class: Insecta
- Order: Coleoptera
- Suborder: Polyphaga
- Infraorder: Elateriformia
- Family: Limnichidae
- Genus: Caccothryptus
- Species: C. larryi

Binomial name
- Caccothryptus larryi Matsumoto, 2021

= Caccothryptus larryi =

Species of beetle

Caccothryptus larryi is a species of minute marsh-loving beetle in the subfamily Limnichinae. The species was described, alongside five other Caccothryptus species, by Natural History Museum entomologist Keita Matsumoto in 2021, using specimens gathered in 1953 by Harry George Champion in Haldwani, India. Both of the C. larryi specimens featured genital structures distinct from Champion's initial classification of C. ripicola. The species was named after Larry, a cat who serves as the Chief Mouser to the Cabinet Office at the British Prime Minister's residence at 10 Downing Street.

== Taxonomy ==
The Limnichidae (minute marsh-loving beetle) genus Caccothryptus was first described by David Sharp in 1902. Native to southern and eastern Asia, Caccothryptus beetles generally live in forests, inside piles of water-logged dead wood adjacent to small streams. In 2014, the genus was divided into five species groups by entomologists Carles Hernando and Ignacio Ribera based on similarities in genital shape and some external features. This reclassification and reanalysis of Caccothryptus specimens under the new system brought the total number of species to 20, up from a previous total of seven. Further research has brought this count to 37 as of 2026.

One group, named for C. compactus, was identified for the shared innovations of dissimilar front claws on males (with the inner claw being longer and more curved), the presence of glandular pores on only the 4th sternite (abdomen segment), separated parameres (part of the external male genitalia), and a furrow running across the central lobe of the aedeagus. No other Caccothryptus species group has differences between its claws, while the presence of the other features vary between different groups.

A group of Caccothryptus specimens were collected in 1953 by forester Harry George Champion in the Haldwani division of the Kumaon Himalayas, India. These were labeled as C. ripicola and C. testudo, species which George Charles Champion had previously described in 1923. These were stored at the British Natural History Museum in London. In 2021, Natural History Museum entomologist Keita Matsumoto identified six new species from these specimens: C. brendelli, C. arakawae, C. championi, and C. tardarsauceae in the C. testudo species group, and C. larryi and C. abboti in the C. compactus group. One male specimen was designated as the holotype, with a female from the same location serving as a paratype. This new species was placed in the species group typified by C. compactus, and was named after Larry, a cat serving as Chief Mouser to the Cabinet Office in the Prime Minister of the United Kingdom's office at 10 Downing Street.

== Description ==
C. larryi has an elongated, oval-shaped body, dark brown and covered with long, light yellow setae. Its tarsi are divided into five segments, of increasing length, with the fifth segment as long as the others combined. It has long, narrow, light brown tarsal claws. The head is smooth and punctured, is slightly retracted into its pronotum, and features eleven-segment antennae. Little sexual dimorphism exists between the male and female specimens, beyond a longer fifth abdominal ventrite on the female. Its elytra are longer than they are wide, and slightly curved, with their tips pointed and nearly forming a right angle. They are covered in a mix of small-to-medium sized punctures, with a smooth, shiny surface between them.

The beetle's genitals display a number of differences from their original classification of C. ripicola, which enabled its recognition as a separate species. The parameres of C. larryi have oval-shaped notches on the upper side, as opposed to the semicircular notches of C. ripicola; they also feature asymmetrical notches on the side of the median lobe, and are generally wider and shorter. The depression between the parameres in C. larryi are narrow and elongated with a pointed end.
