= Caccothryptus wuyishanensis =

Scientific classification
- Kingdom: Animalia
- Phylum: Arthropoda
- Clade: Pancrustacea
- Class: Insecta
- Order: Coleoptera
- Suborder: Polyphaga
- Infraorder: Elateriformia
- Family: Limnichidae
- Genus: Caccothryptus
- Species: C. wuyishanensis

Binomial name
- Caccothryptus wuyishanensis Yoshitomi and Hájek, 2026

Species of beetle

Caccothryptus wuyishanensis is a species of minute marsh-loving beetle in the subfamily Limnichinae. Discovered in the eponymous Wuyi Mountains of northwestern Fujian, it was described by entomologists Hiroyuki Yoshitomi and Jiří Hájek in 2026. It is part of the C. testudo group of species, but can be distinguished by the rectangular shape and deep notches of the tips of its parameres (part of the external male reproductive organs), and the small serrations on the side of the median lobe of the aedeagus (the male reproductive organ).

== Taxonomy ==
The Wuyi Mountains of Fujian, China, where C. wuyishanensis was discovered and for which it was named

Caccothryptus, a genus of minute marsh-loving beetle in the subfamily Limnichinae, was first described by entomologist David Sharp in 1902. Native to southern and eastern Asia, Caccothryptus beetles generally live in forests, inside piles of water-logged dead wood adjacent to small streams. In 2014, the genus was divided into five species groups by entomologists Carles Hernando and Ignacio Ribera based on similarities in genital shape and some external features. This reclassification and reanalysis of Caccothryptus specimens under the new system brought the total number of species to 20, up from a previous total of 7. Further research has brought this count to 37. One group, named for C. testudo, its type species, is distinguished by its separated parameres (part of the external genitalia of males), and—unlike the C. compactus group—the lack of a long longitudinal furrow along the median lobe of the aedeagus (male reproductive organ), alongside a lack of differentiation between the anterior claws on males.

Caccothryptus wuyishanensis was described by entomologists Hiroyuki Yoshitomi and Jiří Hájek in 2026 alongside two fellow Caccothryptus species from Laos and Indonesia. It was described using two male specimens collected in 2018 in the Wuyi Mountains (Chinese: 武夷山; pinyin: Wǔyíshān) of northwestern Fujian, China, by Hájek's team. It was named for the mountain range where it was found. A C. testudo group species, C. wuyishanensis most closely resembles the related C. jendeki (from Meghalaya, India) and C. sinensis (also from Fujian), but can be distinguished by the indistinct serrations on the sides of the median lobe of the aedeagus, and the rectangular shape of the tips of the parameres, which also bear deep U-shaped notches.

== Description ==
Caccothryptus wuyishanensis has a black, shiny, oblong body, convex on both its upper and lower sides, covered closely with silvery setae of varying lengths. The two specimens collected are both about 4.26 millimetres (0.168 in) in length. Its antennae and legs are dark brown, with its foreclaws equal in size and shape. The head and pronotum (upper plate of the prothorax) are densely covered in fine punctures, while the antennae are slender, reaching about one-eighth of the way down the elytra. Its elytra, about 3.24 millimetres (0.128 in) long and 2.3 millimetres (0.091 in) wide, have wide bases which gently taper, with occasional fine punctures. Golden setae are pressed closely to the elytra, forming zig-zag patterns. Its scutellar shield is equilaterally triangular.

Males have slightly sclerotized (harned by sclerotin) 8th and 9th sternites (segments of the abdomen), with the latter being elongated. The aedeagus is stout, about 1.2 millimetres (0.047 in) in length, and gently curves downward at the tip. The median lobe of the aedeagus is wide, with small denticles along its bottom. No female specimens are known.
