= Caccothryptus tibetanus =

- A damaged C. tibetanus specimen

Scientific classification
- Kingdom: Animalia
- Phylum: Arthropoda
- Clade: Pancrustacea
- Class: Insecta
- Order: Coleoptera
- Suborder: Polyphaga
- Infraorder: Elateriformia
- Family: Limnichidae
- Genus: Caccothryptus
- Species: C. tibetanus

Binomial name
- Caccothryptus tibetanus Yoshitomi, 2015

Species of beetle

Caccothryptus tibetanus is a species of minute marsh-loving beetle in the subfamily Limnichinae. It was described in 2015 alongside three other East Asian Caccothryptus species by entomologist Hiroyuki Yoshitomi, using four specimens collected in Zayu, Tibet, in 1996. Part of the C. testudo species group, it is most closely related to C. sinensis, but differs slightly in the shape of its genitals.

== Taxonomy ==
Caccothryptus, a genus of minute marsh-loving beetle in the subfamily Limnichinae, was first described by entomologist David Sharp in 1902. In 2014, the genus was divided into five species groups by entomologists Carles Hernando and Ignacio Ribera based on similarities in genital shape and some external features. Reclassification and reanalysis of Caccothryptus specimens under the new system brought the total number of species to 20, up from a previous total of seven. One group, named for C. testudo, is distinguished by its separated paramere (part of the external genitalia of males), and—unlike the C. compactus group—the lack of a long longitudinal furrow along the median lobe of the aedeagus (male reproductive organ), alongside a lack of differentiation between the anterior claws on males.

In 2015, four new species of the C. testudo group were described by entomologist Hiroyuki Yoshitomi using specimens collected from across East Asia. These include two species collected in 1996 in Zayu (or Chayu), Tibet, at an elevation of 1,824 metres (5,984 ft) above sea level: C. chayuensis and C. tibetanus, both named after their place of discovery. The only male specimen collected of C. tibetanus was designated as its holotype, while three females were designated as paratype. C. tibetanus was found to be most closely related to C. sinensis (collected in eastern China), but differed from it in the shape of the median lobe of its aedeagus. Unlike C. sinensis, the median lobe of C. tibetanus straightly projects backwards, while the emargination (notching on the edges) of its parameres is slightly wider.

== Description ==
Aedeagus of C. tibetanus, with ventral (A), dorsal (b), and lateral (c) views

Caccothryptus beetles commonly live in piles of dead, water-logged wood located along forest streams. C. tibetanus has an oblong body, slightly convex along its underside, and significantly more so on its upper side. Its body is dark brown, shiny, and covered with a dense layer of short, silvery setae. The femora and tarsi (the bottom portions of the legs) are slightly paler in coloration. It is of average size for its genus: the specimens examined for its description ranged from 4.4 to 4.7 millimetres (0.17 to 0.19 in) in length.

The beetle's elytra are oblong, with nearly parallel sides at their base which gently narrow to relatively pointed apex in the final quarter of their length. The elytra are covered in dense, regular set of punctures, closer to one another than their diameter. Silver setae, pressed closely to the surface, cover the elytra in zigzag patterns. The elytra vary between 3.4 and 3.9 millimetres (0.13 and 0.15 in) in length, and 2.45 and 2.8 millimetres (0.096 and 0.11 in) in width. The head is slightly convex on its upper side, and is covered with a dense array of small indentations. The antennae are long, reaching about one-fifth of the way down the elytra. The humeral parts (or shoulders) project upwards, while the claws on the forelegs do not differ in shape or size. The ninth sternite (underside segment of the abdomen) is enlogated, with long, slender projections sticking out from its sides.

There is no noticeable sexual dimorphism. Females have highly sclerotized (hardened by sclerotin) ovipositors, while the male has a stout aedeagus which curves downwards at its end. The tips of the parameres and the medial lobe of the aedeagus are covered in small punctures. The median lobe is slender and pointy, while the emargination at the end of its pointed parameres form deep U-shapes.
