= Caccothryptus schillhammeri =

Scientific classification
- Kingdom: Animalia
- Phylum: Arthropoda
- Clade: Pancrustacea
- Class: Insecta
- Order: Coleoptera
- Suborder: Polyphaga
- Infraorder: Elateriformia
- Family: Limnichidae
- Genus: Caccothryptus
- Species: C. schillhammeri

Binomial name
- Caccothryptus schillhammeri Hernando and Ribera, 2017

Species of beetle

Caccothryptus schillhammeri is a species of minute marsh-loving beetle in the subfamily Limnichinae. In 2017, entomologists Carles Hernando and Ignacio Ribera described the species from four specimens collected in the Sagaing Region of Myanmar by entomologist and mineralogist Harald Schillhammer, naming the species for him. Classified in the C. compactus species group, it is the only Caccothryptus species with a reticulated aedeagus (male genital organ).

== Taxonomy ==
The Limnichidae (minute marsh-loving beetle) genus Caccothryptus, within the subfamily Limnichinae, was first described by David Sharp in 1902. Native to southern and eastern Asia, Caccothryptus beetles generally live in forests, inside piles of water-logged dead wood adjacent to small streams. In 2014, the genus was divided into five species groups by entomologists Carles Hernando and Ignacio Ribera based on similarities in genital shape and some external features. This reclassification and reanalysis of Caccothryptus specimens under the new system brought the total number of species to 20, up from a previous total of seven. Further research has brought this count to 37 as of 2026.

One group, named for C. compactus, was identified for the shared presence of dissimilar front claws on males (with the inner claw being longer and more curved), the presence of glandular pores on only the fourth sternite (abdomen segment), separated parameres (part of the external male genitalia), and a furrow running across the central lobe of the aedeagus (male genitalia). No other Caccothryptus species group has differences between its claws, while the presence of the other features vary between different groups.

In 2017, Hernando and Ribera described three additional species of Caccothryptus: one in the C. testudo group (C. occidentalis) and two in the C. compactus group (C. schillhammeri and C. thai). C. schillhammeri was described from six specimens collected in Alaungdaw Kathapa National Park in Sagaing Region of Myanmar by Harald Schillhammer, an entomologist and mineralogist for whom the species was named. C. schillhammeri can be distinguished from other C. compactus group species by its reticulated aedeagus, an entirely unique feature among Caccothryptus species.

== Description ==
C. schillhammeri has a black, oval-shaped body, ranging from 3.7 to 4.2 millimetres (0.15 to 0.17 in) in length and 2.1 to 2.2 millimetres (0.083 to 0.087 in) in width, with dark brown antennae, legs, and appendages. The head is covered by uniform, dense punctures, separated by spaces smaller than their diameters, alongside erect reddish-brown setae and denser golden, recumbent (lying close to the surface) setae. Its pronotum (top plate of the prothorax) is similarly punctured to the head, except with wider gaps, and with much larger erect setae. The elytra are covered by both small, dense punctures and large, irregular punctures forming series of 4-5 indentations, with similar setae to the pronotum, with the shorter, recumbent setae forming zigzag patterns. Its underside is black, except for brown areas in its ventrites (externally-visible abdomen segments). The underside is entirely covered in setae except for the smooth hypomeras (the portions of the pronotum visible from below).

The outer edges of the parameres and the sides of the medial lobe of the aedeagus are reticulated transversely. The parameres have very narrow tips with deep notches, and some serration along the middle of each paramere.
