= Caccothryptus taiwanus =

Scientific classification
- Kingdom: Animalia
- Phylum: Arthropoda
- Clade: Pancrustacea
- Class: Insecta
- Order: Coleoptera
- Suborder: Polyphaga
- Infraorder: Elateriformia
- Family: Limnichidae
- Genus: Caccothryptus
- Species: C. taiwanus

Binomial name
- Caccothryptus taiwanus Yoshitomi, 2015

Species of beetle

Caccothryptus taiwanus is a species of minute marsh-loving beetle in the subfamily Limnichinae. It was described in 2015 alongside three other East Asian Caccothryptus species by entomologist Hiroyuki Yoshitomi. Native to Taiwan, C. taiwanus is most closely related to the C. testudo species group, with its paramere (external male genitalia) particularly resembling C. sinensis. However, it can be distinguished by the median lobe of its aedeagus (male reproductive organ), which is rounder and straighter than C. sinensis.

== Taxonomy ==
Caccothryptus, a genus of minute marsh-loving beetle in the subfamily Limnichinae, was first described by entomologist David Sharp in 1902. Native to southern and eastern Asia, Caccothryptus beetles generally live in forests, inside piles of water-logged dead wood adjacent to small streams. In 2014, the genus was divided into five species groups by entomologists Carles Hernando and Ignacio Ribera based on similarities in genital shape and some external features. This reclassification and reanalysis of Caccothryptus specimens under the new system brought the total number of species to 20, up from a previous total of seven. Further research has brought this count to 37. One group, named for C. testudo, its type species, is distinguished by its separated parameres (part of the external genitalia of males), and—unlike the C. compactus group—the lack of a long longitudinal furrow along the median lobe of the aedeagus (male reproductive organ), alongside a lack of differentiation between the anterior claws on males.

In 2015, four new species of the C. testudo group were described by entomologist Hiroyuki Yoshitomi using specimens collected from across East Asia: C. taiwanus, C. tibetanus, C. chayuensis, and C. orion. Caccothryptus taiwanus was described from five males and eight females collected in Taiwan from 1970 to 2011 and named after their place of collection. The holotype is a male collected in Yilan (in northeastern Taiwan) in 2011 by C. F. Lee.

== Description ==
Above, below, and side views of the aedeagus of C. taiwanus

C. taiwanus has a smaller body than many other Caccothryptus species, with the collected males measuring between 3.73 and 4.05 millimetres (0.147 and 0.159 in) in length, and the collected females between 3.75 and 4.20 millimetres (0.148 and 0.165 in). C. taiwanus's body is oblong, shiny, and slightly convex on both its upper and lower sides. It is primarily black in color, with paler color on the legs and antennae. Silvery setae of varying lengths cover its body densely. Its head is covered in dense punctures, and is slightly convex on its upper side. It has relatively long antennae which reach about a quarter of the length down its elytra. Its scutellum is equilaterally triangular and covered in fine punctures. The elytra are oblong and widest in their middle, arcing slightly on their edges. They are covered in irregular markings, long silver setae pressed closely to the surface in zigzag patterns, and coarse, irregular punctures, with each puncture about as far away from one another as their diameter. The claws on each of its forelegs are identical in size and shape.

C. taiwanus has little sexual dimorphism. The aedeagus is stout, with its tip curving straight downwards. Both the median lobe of the aedeagus and the parameres are covered in small punctures, while the parameres have a deep U-shaped notch at its tips. Its parameres strongly resemble C. sinensis, found in Fujian, although C. taiwanus's median lobe can be distinguished by its rounder apex and its straight projection towards its posterior—as opposed to the curved, downward and posterior projection of C. sinensis.
