= Caccothryptus gowanensis =

Scientific classification
- Kingdom: Animalia
- Phylum: Arthropoda
- Clade: Pancrustacea
- Class: Insecta
- Order: Coleoptera
- Suborder: Polyphaga
- Infraorder: Elateriformia
- Family: Limnichidae
- Genus: Caccothryptus
- Species: C. gowanensis

Binomial name
- Caccothryptus gowanensis Yoshitomi and Hájek, 2026

Species of beetle

Caccothryptus gowanensis is a species of minute marsh-loving beetle in the genus Caccothryptus, within the subfamily Limnichinae. It was described in 2026 by entomologists Hiroyuki Yoshitomi and Jiří Hájek from two male specimens collected near Malino, Indonesia (on the island of Sulawesi) in 2015. It is the only known member of the C. jaechi species group in southern Sulawesi, and can be distinguished from other members of the group from the long, subparallel sides of the median lobe of the aedeagus (male genital organ), the minute serrations on the underside of the lobe, and the wide and shallowly-concave tips of the paramere (external male genitalia).

== Taxonomy ==
Caccothryptus, a genus of minute marsh-loving beetle in the subfamily Limnichinae, was first described by entomologist David Sharp in 1902. Native to southern and eastern Asia, Caccothryptus beetles generally live in forests, inside piles of water-logged dead wood adjacent to small streams. In 2014, the genus was divided into five species groups by entomologists Carles Hernando and Ignacio Ribera based on similarities in genital shape and some external features. This reclassification and reanalysis of Caccothryptus specimens under the new system brought the total number of species to 20, up from a previous total of 7. Further research has brought this count to 37. One species group, named for C. jaechi, is distinguished by the presence of glandular pores on male's 4th and 5th sternites (abdomen segments) as well as—unlike the C. zetteli group—strong denticles (serration) on the median lobe of the aedeagus (male genital organ). All C. jaechi group species known as of the 2014 paper were found in the Philippines, as well as the Minahasa Peninsula of northeastern Sulawesi, Indonesia.

In 2026, a new species (C. gowanensis) of the jaechi group was described by entomologists Hiroyuki Yoshitomi and Jiří Hájek, using two male specimens collected in 2015 in Gowa Regency in Sulawesi, about 6 kilometres (3.7 mi) east of the town of Malino. They were collected with a light trap about 0.75 kilometres (0.47 mi) from a river near the border of a garden and pine forests. C. gowanensis is the first C. jaechi group species known from southern Sulawesi. It was named for the region in which it was discovered. It can be distinguished from other species of the group from the long, subparallel sides of the median lobe of the aedeagus, the minute serrations on the underside of the lobe, and the wide and shallowly-concave tips of the paramere (external male genitalia).

== Description ==
C. gowanensis has a black, shiny, oblong oval-shaped body, ranging from 3.30 to 3.45 millimetres (0.130 to 0.136 in) in length, with dark brown antennae and legs. The body is convex on both its upper and lower sides. The body is covered with silvery setae of varying lengths, while its pronotum (top plate of the prothorax) and head are covered in small, densely-packed indentations. Its scutellar shield forms an equilateral triangle, while its elytra are widest at their base, tapering gently towards their rear. The elytra are covered with a scarce array of fine indentations, with larger, distinct indentations in rows, and golden setae pressed closely to the surface, forming zigzag patterns. The elytra range from 2.6 to 2.7 millimetres (0.10 to 0.11 in) in length and 1.80 to 1.93 millimetres (0.071 to 0.076 in) in width.

The 8th sternite is U-shaped and slightly sclerotized (hardened by sclerotin), while the 9th is slightly sclerotized but elongated. The adeagus is long, slender, and gently curved downward at the tip, about 1.0 millimetre (0.039 in) in total length. The median lobe of the aedeagus is also long and slender, with minute serrations at the bottom-middle section. It has an unseperated paramere, with a wide, shallowly-concave tip, which bears small furrows running along the top's surface.
