= Caccothryptus orion =

- Caccothryptus orion

Scientific classification
- Kingdom: Animalia
- Phylum: Arthropoda
- Clade: Pancrustacea
- Class: Insecta
- Order: Coleoptera
- Suborder: Polyphaga
- Infraorder: Elateriformia
- Family: Limnichidae
- Genus: Caccothryptus
- Species: C. orion

Binomial name
- Caccothryptus orion Yoshitomi, 2015

Species of beetle

Caccothryptus orion is a species of minute marsh-loving beetle in the subfamily Limnichinae. Native to the island of Okinawa in southwestern Japan, it was described in 2015 by entomologist Hiroyuki Yoshitomi. Part of the C. testudo species group, it closely resembles the related C. taiwanus in both physical appearance and genital configuration, but can be distinguished by the pointed tips of its parameres (part of the male genitalia) when viewed from the side.

== Taxonomy ==
The aedeagus of C. Orion, from below (F), above (G), and the side (H)

The Limnichidae (minute marsh-loving beetle) genus Caccothryptus was first described by David Sharp in 1902. Native to southern and eastern Asia, Caccothryptus beetles generally live in forests, inside piles of water-logged dead wood adjacent to small streams. In 2014, the genus was divided into five species groups by Carles Hernando and Ignacio Ribera. A group named for C. testudo is distinguished by its separated paramere (part of the external genitalia of males), and—unlike the C. compactus group—the lack of a long longitudinal furrow along the median lobe of the aedeagus (male reproductive organ), alongside a lack of differentiation between the anterior claws on males. Many members of the C. testudo group are native to the Himalayas of Nepal and northern India, although others have been found in China, Vietnam and Thailand.

In 2015, four new species of the C. testudo group were described by entomologist Hiroyuki Yoshitomi using specimens collected from across East Asia. One of these new species, C. orion, was described from six specimens—two males and four females—collected across Okinawa Island in southwestern Japan during the 1990s, 2000s, and 2010s. The holotype was a male collected in Nago in 2015 by Masato Mori, found under the surface of water-logged wood near a small river. It was named for Orion Beer, a locally-popular beer produced by Orion Breweries in Okinawa near the location it was discovered.

C. orion can be differentiated from related species by the anatomy of its genitalia. These are most similar to C. taiwanus (another species described by Yoshitomi in 2015), but can be differentiated by the pointed tips of its parameres when viewed from the side, featuring furrows along their bottoms. Additionally, the tip of the median lobe of the aedeagus is more pointed.

== Description ==
C. orion has a small body compared to other Caccothryptus species: its total length ranges between 3.68 and 3.73 millimetres (0.145 and 0.147 in) for the male specimens and 3.82 and 4.00 millimetres (0.150 and 0.157 in) for the female specimens. Its body closely resembles C. taiwanus, but is slightly smaller and more slender. It has coarse punctures across its elytra, which range from 2.83 to 3.10 millimetres (0.111 to 0.122 in) in length and 2.00 to 2.20 millimetres (0.079 to 0.087 in) in width.

There is little sexual dimorphism among C. orion specimens. For males, the eighth sternite (abdomen segment) is U-shaped, with short setae on its tips, while the ninth sternite is quite wide. The aedeagus is stout, with its tip curved downwards. Both the tip of the median lobe of the adeagus and its parameres are covered in punctures. The parameres have tips which are round when viewed from below, but pointed when viewed from the side. Females have a highly sclerotized (hardened by sclerotin) ovipositor.
