= Caccothryptus occidentalis =

Scientific classification
- Kingdom: Animalia
- Phylum: Arthropoda
- Clade: Pancrustacea
- Class: Insecta
- Order: Coleoptera
- Suborder: Polyphaga
- Infraorder: Elateriformia
- Family: Limnichidae
- Genus: Caccothryptus
- Species: C. occidentalis

Binomial name
- Caccothryptus occidentalis Hernando and Ribera, 2017

Species of beetle

Caccothryptus occidentalis is a species of minute marsh-loving beetle of the genus Caccothryptus, within the subfamily Limnichinae. It was described in 2017 by entomologists Carles Hernando and Ignacio Ribera, with a specimen collected in Dehradun district, Uttarakhand, India, in 2006 serving as its holotype. It was named for its status as the westernmost species known from the genus. Its body is dark brown and oval-shaped, with fine indentations and setae found across much of its body. Its aedeagus is slightly curved when viewed from the side, with its median lobe very wide and angled downward.

== Taxonomy ==
The Limnichidae (minute marsh-loving beetle) genus Caccothryptus was first described by David Sharp in 1902. Found across southern and eastern Asia, Caccothryptus beetles generally live in forests, inside piles of water-logged dead wood adjacent to small streams. In 2014, the genus was divided into five species groups by entomologists Carles Hernando and Ignacio Ribera based on differences in genital shape and some external features. This reclassification and reanalysis of Caccothryptus specimens under the new system brought the total number of species to 20, up from a previous total of seven. Further research has brought this count to 37 as of 2026.

A group named for C. testudo is distinguished by its separated parameres (part of the external genitalia of males), and—unlike the C. compactus group—the lack of a long longitudinal furrow along the median lobe of the aedeagus (male reproductive organ), alongside a lack of differentiation between the anterior claws on males. Many members of the C. testudo group are native to the Himalayas of Nepal and northern India, although others have been found in China, Vietnam and Thailand. In 2017, Hernando and Ribera described three additional species of Caccothryptus: two in the C. compactus group (C. schillhammeri and C. thai) and one in the C. testudo group (C. occidentalis). C. occidentalis was described from one male specimen (the holotype) collected in 2006 by M. A. Jäch at Teen Pani in Dehradun district, Uttarakhand, India, at an altitude of about 365 metres (1,198 ft) above sea level. Meaning "western", the species name occidentalis (from Latin) refers to its status as the westernmost species known from the genus—although only marginally, as two other species are known from Uttarakhand.

== Description ==
Caccothryptus occidentalis has a dark brown, oval-shaped body, about 4.1 millimetres (0.16 in) long and 2.1 millimetres (0.083 in) wide. Its antennae and legs are also dark brown, except for its protibiae (front penultimate leg segments), which are black, and its tarsi (final leg segments) which are pale. Its head is covered in a uniform pattern of small indentations or punctures, with the distance between them larger than their diameters, as well as a layer of long, erect, golden setae. The pronotum (the top plate of the prothorax) is covered in dense, uniform punctures, and two types of setae: a long, erect reddish-brown type and a shorter golden type pressed close to the surface. The elytra have a very convex base, with similar setae to the pronotum, arranged into zigzag patterns. An irregular pattern of 3–4 punctures in rows is present on parts of the elytra. Setae are found across the underside of the body except for the hypomeras (underside of the pronotum), which is smooth.

The aedeagus of C. occidentalis is slightly curved when viewed from the side, with its median lobe very wide and angled downwards. When viewed from below, the median lobe has a notch and angular sides. The parameres have rounded tips and wavy rim around the notch present at the tip. When viewed from the side, the aedeagus is similar in form to the related species C. jendeki and C. taiwanus.
