= Caccothryptus thai =

Scientific classification
- Kingdom: Animalia
- Phylum: Arthropoda
- Clade: Pancrustacea
- Class: Insecta
- Order: Coleoptera
- Suborder: Polyphaga
- Infraorder: Elateriformia
- Family: Limnichidae
- Genus: Caccothryptus
- Species: C. thai

Binomial name
- Caccothryptus thai Hernando and Ribera, 2017

Species of beetle

Caccothryptus thai is a species of minute marsh-loving beetle in the genus Caccothryptus, within the subfamily Limnichinae. It was described in 2017 by entomologists Carles Hernando and Ignacio Ribera using specimens collected at Doi Inthanon in northern Thailand in 1989, which had been stored uncategorized at the Natural History Museum of Vienna collections. Named for the country in which it was discovered, C. thai can be distinguished from the related species within the C. compactus species group by the presence of two short rows of small dents on the medial lobe of its aedeagus (male genitalia).

== Taxonomy ==
The Limnichidae (minute marsh-loving beetle) genus Caccothryptus, within the subfamily Limnichinae, was first described by David Sharp in 1902. Native to southern and eastern Asia, Caccothryptus beetles generally live in forests, inside piles of water-logged dead wood adjacent to small streams. In 2014, the genus was divided into five species groups by entomologists Carles Hernando and Ignacio Ribera based on similarities in genital shape and some external features. This reclassification and reanalysis of Caccothryptus specimens under the new system brought the total number of species to 20, up from a previous total of seven. Further research has brought this count to 37 as of 2026.

One group, named for C. compactus, was identified for the shared derived traits of dissimilar front claws on males (with the inner claw being longer and more curved), the presence of glandular pores on only the fourth sternite (abdomen segment), separated parameres (part of the external male genitalia), and a furrow running lengthwise on the central lobe of the aedeagus (male genitalia). No other Caccothryptus species group has differences between its claws, while the presence of the other features vary between different groups.

In 2017, Hernando and Ribera described three additional species of Caccothryptus: one in the C. testudo group (C. occidentalis) and two in the C. compactus group (C. schillhammeri and C. thai). Five specimens later identified as C. thai were collected in 1989 at Doi Inthanon in the Shan Hills of northern Thailand and stored uncategorized at the Natural History Museum of Vienna collections, including a male later designated as the holotype. Two unidentified C. compactus group females in Hernando and Ribera's 2014 paper were reclassified as C. thai upon the identification of the males. C. thai was named for the country in which it was discovered.

== Description ==
C. thai has a dark brown, elongated, oval-shaped body, ranging from 4.6 to 4.9 millimetres (0.18 to 0.19 in) in length and 2.5 to 2.6 millimetres (0.098 to 0.102 in) in width. Its tarsi (last segment of the legs) and antennae are light brown, while the rest of its legs are dark brown. Its head and pronotum (top plate of the prothorax) are covered by dense, small, uniform punctures, with those on the head about as far apart from one another as their diameters, and those on the pronotum further apart. The head and protonum both have erect reddish-brown setae and denser golden, recumbent (lying close to the surface) setae. There are denticles (serrations) around the meeting point of the head and the antennae. The elytra have both fine, dense punctures and larger, irregular punctures, with recumbent and generally gold setae forming zigzag patterns.

Caccothryptus thai can be most readily distinguished from other C. compactus group species by the presence of two series of 3–4 irregular, small dents on the bottom edge of the medial lobe of its aedeagus, a feature not shared by any other species in the group. The top part of the base of the parameres has a small serration, while the tips of the parameres and the medial lobe are both narrow and somewhat fusiform.
