= Geolimnichus =

Scientific classification
- Kingdom: Animalia
- Phylum: Arthropoda
- Clade: Pancrustacea
- Class: Insecta
- Order: Coleoptera
- Suborder: Polyphaga
- Infraorder: Elateriformia
- Family: Limnichidae
- Subfamily: Limnichinae
- Genus: Geolimnichus; Hernando and Ribera, 2003

Type species
- G. endroedyi Hernando and Ribera, 2003
- Known findings of Geolimnichus in the Eastern Cape (formerly Transkei) and KwaZulu-Natal provinces of South Africa: Squares: G. coprophilus; Triangles: G. endroedyi

Genus of beetles

Geolimnichus is a genus of minute marsh-loving beetles, endemic to South Africa, in the subfamily Limnichinae. It was discovered in 2003 by Carles Hernando and Ignacio Ribera. It has two known species, G. coprophilus and G. endroedyi, the latter of which is its type species.

== Etymology ==
Geolimnichus's name is derived from the Greek prefix geo- (γεω-; "soil") and Limnichus, a fellow genus from Limnichinae. G. coprophilus's name means "excrement-loving" due to the habits of the species; G. endroedyi is named after Sebastian Endrödy-Younga, a Hungarian entomologist who helped collect specimens of the genus.

== Description ==
Geolimnichus beetles have convex dorsal (top) sides, black to dark brown semicircular bodies, and flat ventral (bottom) sides. Their heads are mostly inside their pronotum, covered in golden trichome, have dense punctures, and have a carina. Their eyes are small and elongated, have parallel sides, and protrude. Their antennae are short and have 11 segments: the first and second segments are short and wide; the third and fourth roughly half as short but the same width; the fifth through eighth cylindrical and decreasing in width; and the ninth through 11th widening and forming a club shape.

The pronota of Geolimnichus beetles are laterally curved. The anterior (front) margin of the pronotum is concave and has a parallel row of tubercles, while the posterior (rear) margin is mostly flat, with curves only on each corner. The surface of the pronotum has less dense trichome and sparser punctures. The scutellum is small and triangular.

The elytra of Geolimnichus beetles are laterally convex, with a mostly flat margin. The surface of the elytra are shiny, sparsely covered in trichome, and have irregular punctures denser than the pronota.

Geolimnichus's two known species are found in the coastal forests of the Eastern Cape and KwaZulu-Natal provinces of southeastern South Africa. During Hernando and Ribera's study, they were found to inhabit the forest floor, humus, and the feces of the Cape bushbuck.

== Taxonomy ==
Geolimnichus is a genus of Limnichinae, a subfamily of Limnichidae (commonly known as minute marsh-loving beetles). Like all other genera of Limnichinae, it has a transversal metacoxa, a five-segment tarsus, oblique carina, and an "excavated" ventral surface. Within Limnichinae, it is most closely related to the genera Limnichus, Limnichoderus, and Limnichomorphus, which share identical antennae, depressions above the eyes for the antennal club, a row of spines on their protibiae (tibiae of the front legs), and setae on the top of the genital segment.

G. coprophilus and G. endroedyi were both scientifically described in 2003 by Carles Hernando and Ignacio Ribera. According to Hernando and Ribera, Geolimnichus was the first discovered genus of minute marsh-loving beetles endemic to South Africa. It was also claimed to be the second known genus of fully terrestrial minute marsh-loving beetles, after Limnichomorphus.

=== Species ===
Geolimnichus has two known species:

Species of Geolimnichus
Species	Type locality	Distribution
G. coprophilus Hernando and Ribera, 2003	Weza Forest; KwaZulu-Natal; 30.32°S 29.41°E	KwaZulu-Natal Weza Forest Stinkwood Forest Pietermaritzburg
G. endroedyi Hernando and Ribera, 2003	Ntsubane Forest; Eastern Cape; 31.27°S 29.44°E	Eastern Cape Ntsubane Forest Silaka Forest
