= Caccothryptus chayuensis =

Scientific classification
- Kingdom: Animalia
- Phylum: Arthropoda
- Clade: Pancrustacea
- Class: Insecta
- Order: Coleoptera
- Suborder: Polyphaga
- Infraorder: Elateriformia
- Family: Limnichidae
- Genus: Caccothryptus
- Species: C. chayuensis

Binomial name
- Caccothryptus chayuensis Yoshitomi, 2015

Species of beetle

Caccothryptus chayuensis is a species of minute marsh-loving beetle in the subfamily Limnichinae. It was described in 2015 alongside three other East Asian Caccothryptus species by entomologist Hiroyuki Yoshitomi. It is known from a single specimen collected in Zayu, Tibet, in 1996. Part of the C. testudo species group, it is most readily distinguished from related species by the presence of minute serrations along the medial lobe of its aedeagus (male reproductive organ). Quite large for its genus, its body is oblong, brown, and covered in short, silvery setae.

== Taxonomy ==
Caccothryptus, a genus of minute marsh-loving beetles in the subfamily Limnichinae, was first described by entomologist David Sharp in 1902. In 2014, the genus was divided into five species groups by entomologists Carles Hernando and Ignacio Ribera based on similarities in genital shape and some external features. Reclassification and reanalysis of Caccothryptus specimens under the new system brought the total number of species to 20, up from a previous total of seven. One group, named for C. testudo, is distinguished by its separated paramere (part of the external genitalia of males), and—unlike the C. compactus group—the lack of a long longitudinal furrow along the median lobe of the aedeagus (male reproductive organ), alongside a lack of differentiation between the anterior claws on males.

In 2015, four new species of the C. testudo group were described by entomologist Hiroyuki Yoshitomi using specimens collected from across East Asia. These include two species described from specimens collected in 1996 in Zayu (or Chayu), Tibet, at an elevation of 1,824 metres (5,984 ft) above sea level: C. chayuensis and C. tibetanus, both named after their place of discovery. The lone specimen of C. chayuensis, its holotype, is a male. It was found to be most closely related to the C. fujianensis (also from China), C. malickyi (from Vietnam), and C. jendeki (from India) but differed from them due to the presence of minute, pointed serrations along the bottom of its medial aedeagus lobe, as well as relatively shallow emargination on its parameres.

== Description ==
C. chayuensis aedeagus as seen from below (E), above (F), and the side (G)

Caccothryptus beetles commonly live in piles of dead, water-logged wood located along forest streams. C. chayuensis has an oblong body, slightly convex along its underside, and significantly more so on its upper side. Its body is dark brown, shiny, and covered with a dense layer of short, silvery setae. The femora and tarsi (portions of the arthropod leg) are slightly paler in coloration. It is quite large in comparison to other Caccothryptus species, with the one known specimen having a total body length of 5.9 millimetres (0.23 in).

C. chayuensis's head is slightly convex on its upper side and features a dense pattern of fine punctures, and has long antennae which reach about a fifth of the way down its elytra. These elytra are oblong, with nearly parallel sides at their base which gently narrow to a relatively pointed tip in the final quarter of their length. They are covered sparsely and irregularly with punctures, further apart from one another than their diameters, and covered by silver setae in zigzag patterns. The elytra of the one known specimen are 4.8 millimetres (0.19 in) in length and 3.2 millimetres (0.13 in) in width. The humeral parts (or shoulders) are highly convex on their upper side, while the foreleg claws are identical in size and shape. The eighth sternite (underside segment of the abdomen) is U-shaped, with short setae on the raised portions, while the ninth sternite is elongated, with long, slender projections sticking out from its sides.

The aedeagus is slender and slightly curved downwards. The median lobe is wide and pointed, with minute serrations along its bottom. The tips of both the median lobe and the parameres are covered by dense punctures. These parameres have pointed tips, described by Yoshitomi as "thumb-like" when viewed from below, with V-shaped emarginations.
