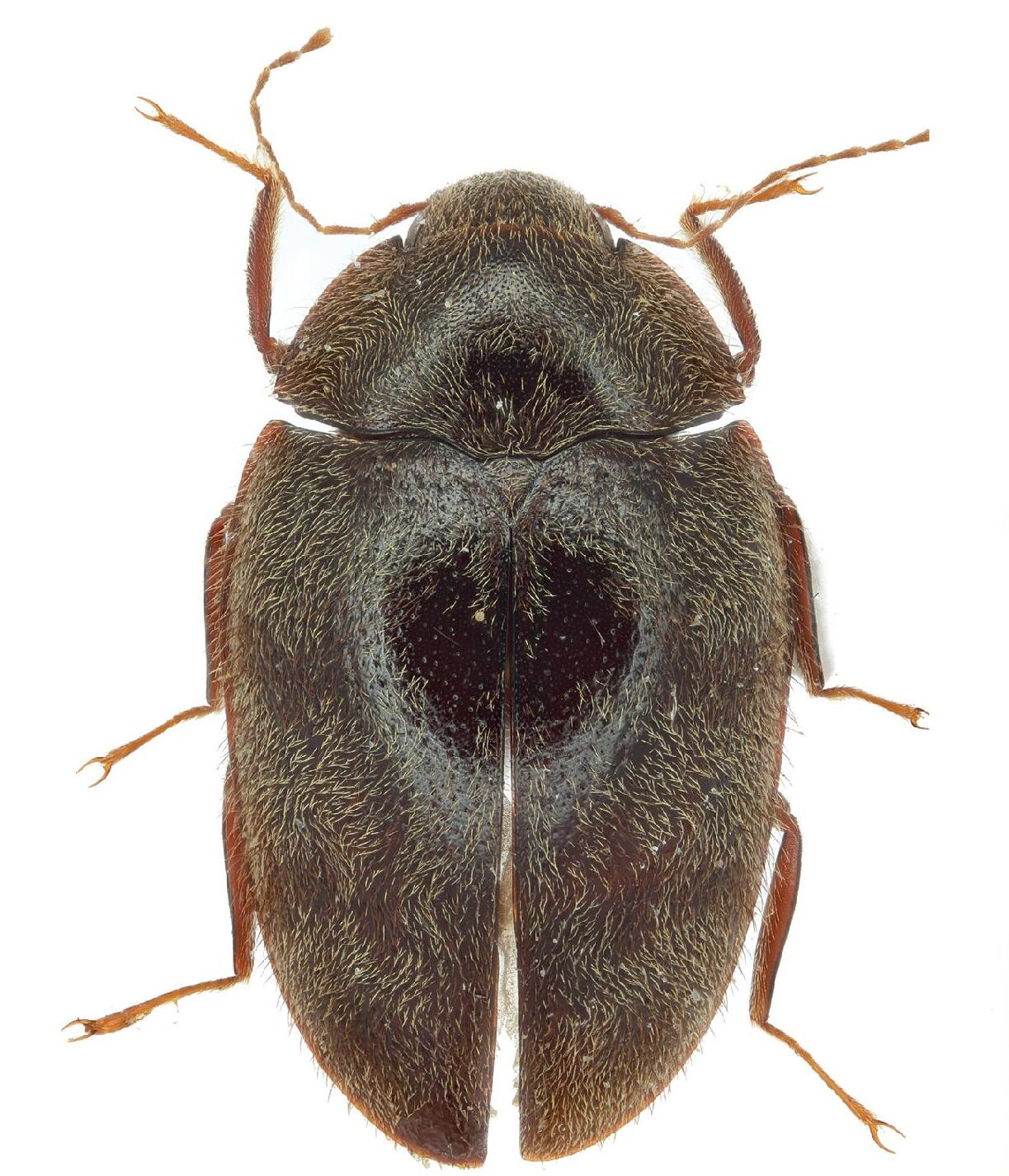
- C. championi

Scientific classification
- Kingdom: Animalia
- Phylum: Arthropoda
- Clade: Pancrustacea
- Class: Insecta
- Order: Coleoptera
- Suborder: Polyphaga
- Infraorder: Elateriformia
- Family: Limnichidae
- Subfamily: Limnichinae
- Genus: Caccothryptus; Sharp, 1902

Type species
- C. compactus

Diversity
- 34 species

Synonyms
- Macrobyrrhinus Pic, 1922

= Caccothryptus =

Genus of beetles

Caccothryptus is a genus of minute marsh-loving beetles in the subfamily Limnichinae. The genus was formally established (circumscribed) by the entomologist David Sharp in 1902, with C. compactus as the type species. In 2014, the entomologists Carles Hernando and Ignacio Ribera published a major revision of the genus, reorganizing it from seven species into twenty species in five species groups, classified mainly by similarities in genital shape. Discoveries in the following years have brought the total number of species up to thirty-four. Due to the relative lack of studies and material on Asian Limnichidae, more species are likely still to be described. Ranging from 2.5 to 5.5 mm in total length, the beetles have ovoid bodies ranging from black to brown in color. Their range extends across Southeast Asia, alongside portions of East Asia and South Asia. They generally live in water-logged dead wood adjacent to small streams.

== Taxonomy ==
Caccothryptus is a genus of Limnichinae, a subfamily of the minute marsh-loving beetles (Limnichidae). The Limnichidae are a diverse family of beetle, absent only from alpine and polar regions, as well as most oceanic islands. They are most commonly riparian, living on the shores of rivers, although some are intertidal (living along beaches or coral formations). However, many genera are fully terrestrial, living in forest litter. Little research has been done on most genera, and the larvae and pupae of most are especially poorly documented. Most species are herbivorous.

Within Limnichinae, Caccothryptus belongs to the "Mandersia group" of genera, alongside Euthryptus, Mandersia, Pseudothryptus, Resachus, and Simplocarina, all much smaller taxa in terms of species count. These genera share a number of physical features, such as a non-articulated (jointed) aedeagus (the male reproductive organ). These lack an articulated spiculum (internal piece) within the median lobe; this distinguishes them from the genus Byrrhinus. The Afrotropical genera Tricholimnichus and Cyclolimnichus are close relatives of the Mandersia group, but lack some distinguishing characteristics in the pronotum (dorsal plate of the thorax).

=== Taxonomic history ===
In 1902, the entomologist David Sharp described Caccothryptus compactus (found in Martapura, Borneo) in an article in the Entomologist's Monthly Magazine. He dubbed the genus as the "largest and most remarkable of the Limnichini" and noted its close resemblance to the Central American genus Euthryptus. Caccothryptus was the first circumscribed Limnichinae genus native to Asia. Sharp did not list an etymology for the name Caccothryptus in his description of C. compactus.

In 1922 and 1923, Maurice Pic circumscribed a new genus he termed Macrobyrrhinus, and placed in it four species of Limnichinae, with M. rouyeri as the type species. George Charles Champion treated this genus as a synonym of Caccothryptus, in a paper describing three additional species. Pic disregarded Champion's synonymy and placed more species in Macrobyrrhinus in 1928; however, it is now accepted as a synonym.

Caccothryptus received no further mention in entomological literature until 1998, when it was listed in a checklist of East Asian Limnichidae species. In 2005, the entomologists Carles Hernando and Ignacio Ribera reclassified one species described by Champion, C. multiseriatus, into a new genus dubbed Pseudothryptus. Nine years later, Hernando and Ribera published a major revision of the genus. Previously grouped as seven species, it was reorganized into twenty species in five species groups—compactus, rouyeri, testudo, jaechi, and zetteli—mainly classified based on similarities in genital shape, and to a lesser extant certain external features. This 2014 revision also classified one of Champion's species, C. laosensis, as a synonym of C. maculosus.

=== Species and species groups ===
All Caccothryptus species have a non-articulated aedeagus, while their parameres (side lobes of the external genitalia) can be either separated or fused. This can vary even within a species group, although all species of compactus and testudo have separated parameres. A lobe along the center of the aedeagus has a sulcus (groove), which varies between species groups. C. rouyeri, the only species of the rouyeri group, can be distinguished by lateral expansions on the median lobe of its aedeagus, while the jaechi group can be recognized by a denticled (serrated) ventral portion of this lobe.

All species have microscopic glandular pores on the middle portion of the fourth sternite (one of the rear segments of the abdomen), while the jaechi and zetteli groups also have these on the sides of the fifth sternite. Males of compactus group species have dissimilar front claws, with the internal claw longer and more indented than the external.

Fifteen new species of Caccothryptus have been identified since the 2014 redescription, all within the compactus and testudo groups. The current number of 37 species is likely to increase further, due to a relative lack of studies and material on Asian Limnichidae. Many species are only known from a tiny number of specimens within a small area. In terms of species count, Caccothryptus is among the largest genera of minute marsh-loving beetles, behind fellow Limnichidae genera Byrrhinus and Limnichus.

Species and species groups of Caccothryptus
Group name	Anterior claws (male)	Sternite pores (male)	Median lobe of aedeagus	Parameres	Species	Ref
compactus	Dissimilar	On 4th sternite	Full longitudinal sulcus	Separated	C. abboti, C. compactus, C. larryi, C. maculosus, C. schillhammeri, C. schuhi, C. sulawesianus, C. thai	
rouyeri	Similar	On 4th sternite	Lateral expansions, partial longitudinal sulcus	Fused	C. rouyeri	
testudo	Similar	On 4th sternite	No lateral expansions, denticles, or longitudinal sulcus	Separated	C. arakawae, C. auratus, C. brendelli, C. championi, C. chayuensis, C. fujianensis, C. jendeki, C. malickyi, C. nepalensis, C. occidentalis, C. orion, C. punctatus, C. ripicola, C. sinensis, C. taiwanus, C. tardarsauceae, C. testudo, C. tibetanus, C. wakaharai, C. wuyishanensis, C. yunnanensis	
jaechi	Similar	On 4th and 5th sternites	Denticled underside, partial longitudinal sulcus	(varies)	C. gowanensis, C. jaechi, C. nanus, C. ticaoensis, C. wooldridgei	
zetteli	Similar	On 4th and 5th sternites	Partial longitudinal sulcus	(varies)	C. luzonensis, C. zetteli	

== Description ==
The aedeagus (male genital organ) of C. orion, in the C. testudo species group, from below (f), above (g), and the side (h)

Caccothryptus beetles range from 2.5 to 5.5 mm (0.098 to 0.22 in) in length, reaching larger body sizes than any other Limnichidae genus. They have ovoid bodies, ranging from brown to black in color, covered in both long and short layers of setae; the shorter layer lies flat against the surface of the body, while the longer layer stands erect. The color of the setae varies depending on the angle of illumination. The head is slightly retracted into the pronotum, with long and narrow eleven-segment antennae covered in short setae. The underside of the abdomen (ventrum) has deep depressions where the long, slender legs connect with the body. The smooth and shiny surface of their elytra are covered in dense rows of punctures.

Sexual dimorphism is relatively minimal. Females have long ovipositors and gonocoxites (structures covering the underside of the genitals) which taper to a sharp point. Caccothryptus species can be distinguished from most other genera in the Mandersia group due to their lack of slanted frontal sulci (furrows) on their heads. They can be distinguished from the genus Simplocarina (which also lacks these sulci) by their long antennae, which extend beyond the posterior end of their pronotum. Irregular punctures of different sizes form stripes on the surface of their elytra. Additionally, all Caccothryptus species have a longitudinally divided region at the apex of their aedeagus, which forms two distinct lobes.

They generally live in forests adjacent to streams or small rivers. Imago (adults) are often find inside piles of waterlogged dead wood or atop littoral stones. They fly readily and are most often collected using light traps placed near water bodies.

== Range ==
Caccothryptus species are mainly within the Indomalayan biogeographic realm, although some reach the southern frontier of the eastern Palearctic. They have been found across Southeast Asia, parts of southern China, and the northern portion of the Indian subcontinent. The Sunda Islands and Philippines are particular centers of diversity within the genus. Many species are known from a single location, although some have been found across a wide swath of territory. Most notable among these species is C. maculosus, which has a range that encompasses Mainland Southeast Asia plus Hainan, portions of Indonesia, and the Andaman Islands. The jaechi, zetelli, and rouyeri species groups are only found in Maritime Southeast Asia, while the testudo group is absent from the region. Only the compactus group stretches across both.
