= Caccothryptus jaechi =

Scientific classification
- Kingdom: Animalia
- Phylum: Arthropoda
- Class: Insecta
- Order: Coleoptera
- Suborder: Polyphaga
- Infraorder: Elateriformia
- Family: Limnichidae
- Genus: Caccothryptus
- Species: C. jaechi

Binomial name
- Caccothryptus jaechi Hernando and Ribera, 2014

Species of beetle

Caccothryptus jaechi is a species of minute marsh-loving beetle in the subfamily Limnichinae.

== Taxonomy ==
The Limnichidae (minute marsh-loving beetle) genus Caccothryptus, within the subfamily Limnichinae, was first described by the entomologist David Sharp in 1902. In 2014, the genus was divided into five species groups by Carles Hernando and Ignacio Ribera based on similarities in genital shape and some external features. Reclassification and reanalysis of Caccothryptus specimens under the new system brought the total number of species to 23, up from a previous total of seven.

C. jaechi was one of the new species described by Hernando and Ribera. Its holotype was collected in North Sulawesi, Indonesia, in the settlement of Wakan—between the towns of Amurang and Motoling in South Minahasa Regency. It was described as particularly similar to C. wooldridgei, but distinguishable by the shape of its aedeagus.

Caccothryptus species possess a median lobe on their aedeagus (the male reproductive organ). One group of these new species was distinguished by the presence of a denticled (serrated) section along the underside of this lobe, and named the jaechi group, with C. jaechi as its type species. This denticled section separates them from a related species group within Caccothryptus, the zetteli group.

== Description ==
Caccothryptus beetles are commonly found in piles of dead, water-logged wood located along forest streams. C. jaechi has a body length ranging from 2.8–3.1 millimetres (0.11–0.12 in). Its body is black, and is covered with golden setae interrupted by vague reddish bands.
