= Caccothryptus maculosus =

Scientific classification
- Kingdom: Animalia
- Phylum: Arthropoda
- Clade: Pancrustacea
- Class: Insecta
- Order: Coleoptera
- Suborder: Polyphaga
- Infraorder: Elateriformia
- Family: Limnichidae
- Genus: Caccothryptus
- Species: C. maculosus

Binomial name
- Caccothryptus maculosus (Pic, 1922)

Synonyms
- Caccothryptus laosensis Pic, 1922

Species of beetle

Caccothryptus maculosus is a species of minute marsh-loving beetle in the subfamily Limnichinae, found across large parts of Southeast Asia. Initially described by entomologist Maurice Pic in 1922 as Macrobyrrhinus maculosus, it was reclassified as a Caccothryptus species the following year by George Charles Champion. In 2014, during a taxonomic revision of the genus, entomologists Carles Hernando and Ignacio Ribera grouped the species into the C. compactus species group. Hernando and Ribera also classified another species, C. laosensis, as a synonym of C. maculosus. It is very similar to C. compactus in appearance, but can be differentiated by the finer indentation on its head and elytra, and the lack of serration on the inner face of the parameres (external male genitalia).

== Taxonomy ==
The Limnichidae (minute marsh-loving beetle) genus Caccothryptus was first described by entomologist David Sharp in 1902. Native to southern and eastern Asia, Caccothryptus beetles generally live in forests, inside piles of water-logged dead wood adjacent to small streams. In a series of papers during the 1920s, the entomologist Maurice Pic grouped four Limnichidae species into a new genus which he termed Macrobyrrhinus, including one which he named Macrobyrrhinus maculosus in 1922. In 1923, George Charles Champion classified Macrobyrrhinus as a synonym of Caccothryptus in a paper adding several additional species to the genus. Although Pic continued describing new Macrobyrrhinus species, the two genera are now generally accepted as synonyms.

In 2014, the genus was divided into five species groups by entomologists Carles Hernando and Ignacio Ribera based on similarities in genital shape and some external features. This reclassification and reanalysis of Caccothryptus specimens under the new system brought the total number of species to 20, up from a previous total of seven. Further research has brought this count to 37 as of 2026. One group, named for C. compactus, was identified for the shared presence of dissimilar front claws on males (with the inner claw being longer and more curved), the presence of glandular pores on only the fourth sternite (abdomen segment), separated parameres (part of the external male genitalia), and a furrow running across the central lobe of the aedeagus (male genitalia). As part of the 2014 paper, Hernando and Ribera grouped C. maculosus into the C. compactus species group. No other Caccothryptus species group has differences between its claws, while the presence of the other features vary between different groups.

Another species, C. laosensis (initially Macrobyrrhinus laosensis), was also reclassified as a synonym of C. maculosus. The species is very similar in appearance to C. compactus, but can be distinguished by the finer and less dense punctuation on its head and elytra and the lack of serration on the inner face of the parameres.

== Description ==
Caccothryptus maculosus has a black to dark brown body, ranging between 4.5 and 5.4 millimetres (0.18 and 0.21 in) in length. Golden setae (hair-like structures) cover much of its body, with loosely-defined reddish bands visible. Its antennae and legs are dark brown. Its head is covered in fine, dense punctures or indentations, while the pronotum (top plate of the prothorax) has similarly fine but less dense punctures. The elytra (forewings) are covered in dense, coarse punctures, closer to one another than their diameter. The tips of its parameres are clearly truncated when viewed from the side, with broad, rounded recesses on the underside.

The type localities of both Pic's M. laosensis ("Sambua", seemingly in Cambodia despite the species name referencing Laos) and M. maculosus (illegible, possibly "Lac Cobó", in Vietnam) cannot be firmly identified. Other specimens have been recovered from Hainan in China, the Andaman Islands of India, the islands of Bali, Java, and Nias in Indonesia, Laos, Myanmar, Thailand, and Vietnam. A specimen from Luang Prabang, Laos, described as a C. compactus specimen by Champion in 1923, was reclassified in 2014 as C. maculosus.
