= Pseudothryptus =

Scientific classification
- Kingdom: Animalia
- Phylum: Arthropoda
- Clade: Pancrustacea
- Class: Insecta
- Order: Coleoptera
- Suborder: Polyphaga
- Infraorder: Elateriformia
- Family: Limnichidae
- Subfamily: Limnichinae
- Genus: Pseudothryptus; Hernando and Ribera, 2005
- Species: P. multiseriatus

Binomial name
- Pseudothryptus multiseriatus (Champion, 1923)

Genus of beetles

Pseudothryptus multiseriatus is the only species of Pseudothryptus, a genus of minute marsh-loving beetle in the subfamily Limnichinae. Initially described in 1923 as part of the large genus Caccothryptus, it was circumscribed as the genus Pseudothryptus in 2005 due to a number of physical differences with other Limnichidae, especially in its genitalia. It is known only from a few specimens collected in northeastern India before 1922.

== Taxonomy ==
Pseudothryptus multiseriatus is the only species in the genus Pseudothryptus; a genus of Limnichinae, a subfamily of the minute marsh-loving beetles (Limnichidae). Within Limnichinae it belongs to the "Mandersia group" of genera, alongside the large genus Caccothryptus and four other small genera—Euthryptus, Mandersia, Resachus, and Simplocarina. These genera share a number of physical features, such as a non-articulated aedeagus (male reproductive organ) without an articulated internal piece ("spiculum") within the median lobe; this distinguishes the genera from the genus Byrrhinus. The Afrotropical genera Tricholimnichus and Cyclolimnichus are probably close relatives of the Mandersia group, but lack some distinguishing characteristics in the pronotum.

The entomologist George Charles Champion described the species as Caccothryptus multiseriatus in 1923, alongside C. testudo and C. ripicola, using specimens collected in the Eastern Dooars, in the northeast of British India. There is no holotype of the species, although a male specimen in the collections of the Natural History Museum, London, collected by 1922, was designated as the lectotype in 1990. A paralectotype (an additional specimen used in the description) is held by the museum, also collected by 1922. In 2005, entomologists Carles Hernando and Ignacio Ribera reclassified C. multiseriatus into a new genus, Pseudothryptus, due to a number of differences in its genitalia and minor external characteristics.

== Description ==
Pseudothryptus multiseriatus is a small beetle about 2.5 millimetres (0.098 in) in length. Specimens were found in what is now the states of Sikkim and Assam in Northeastern India by Herbert Stevens.

It has a very convex oval body, ranging from brown to dark brown. It has two layers of setae on its elytra; a short layer within the elytra punctures, and a very long and thick layer between the stripes of the elytra. Each highly convex elytron has thirteen rows of punctures, with smooth and shiny surface between these rows. The legs are short and thick. On males, glandular pores cover the entire surface of the 4th sternite (the plates on the underbody of the abdomen), and most of the 5th.

Pseudothryptus's head, slightly retracted into its pronotum (the first exoskeleton plate of its prothorax), is covered with coarse, dense punctures. It has long and slender eleven-segment antennae, extending beyond the back of the pronotum, covered with fine setae. The 1st (top) antennomere (antenna segment) is small and rounded, while the 11th (bottom) is laterally truncated. A deep sulcus (groove) runs behind the eyes, with two deep sulci on the forehead converging at the posterior of the head. Pseudothryptus can be differentiated from other genera through genital characteristics. Like the related genera Mandersia and Euthryptus, the parameres (external reproductive organs) are laterally fused. In contrast to these other genera, their aedeagus possesses a small groove along the apex of its median lobe, while the base of the phallus is symmetrical. No female specimens have been examined.
