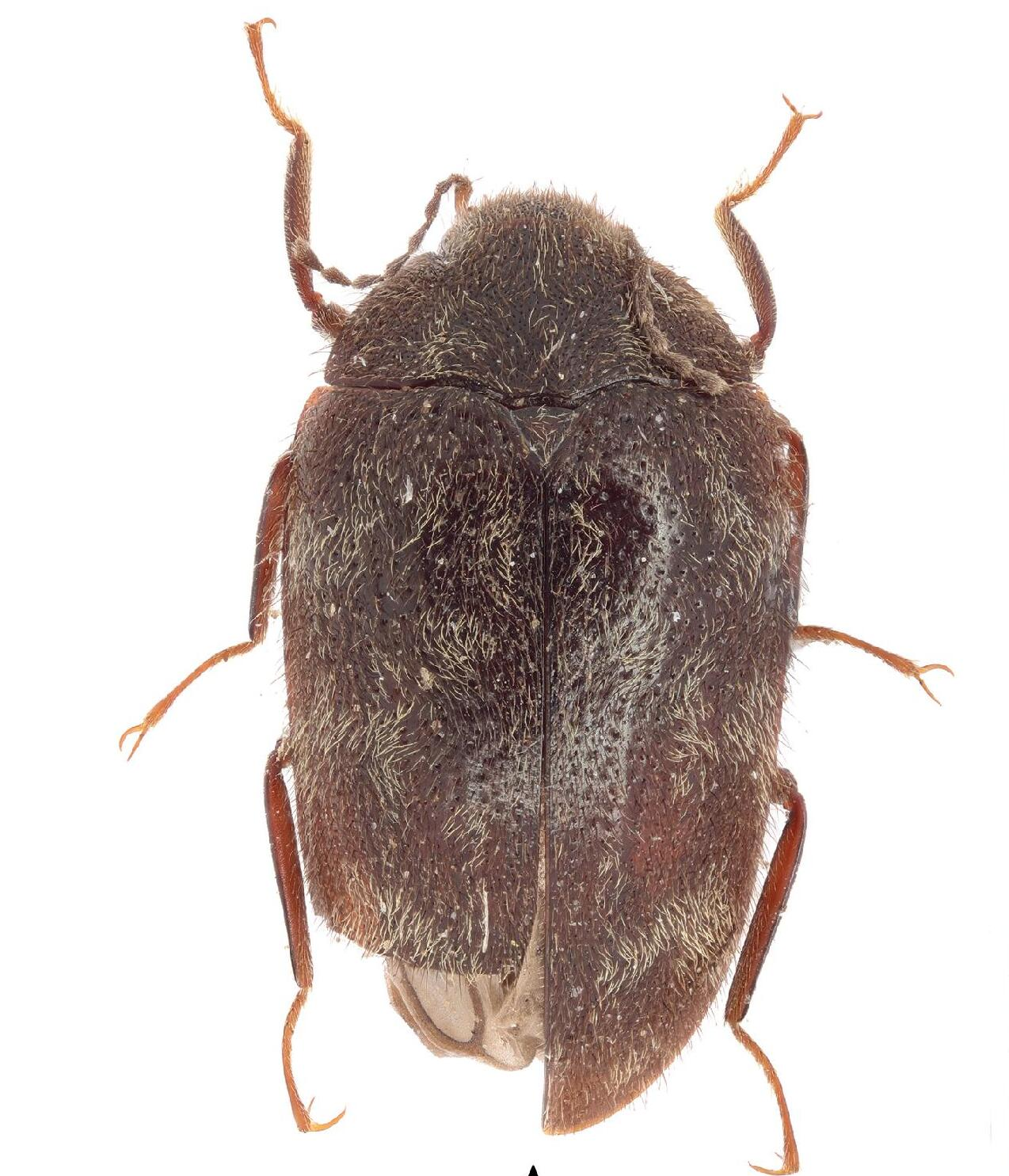
- Damaged C. tardarsauceae specimen

Scientific classification
- Kingdom: Animalia
- Phylum: Arthropoda
- Clade: Pancrustacea
- Class: Insecta
- Order: Coleoptera
- Suborder: Polyphaga
- Infraorder: Elateriformia
- Family: Limnichidae
- Genus: Caccothryptus
- Species: C. tardarsauceae

Binomial name
- Caccothryptus tardarsauceae Matsumoto, 2021

= Caccothryptus tardarsauceae =

Species of beetle

Caccothryptus tardarsauceae is a species of minute marsh-loving beetle in the subfamily Limnichinae. The species was described alongside five other Caccothryptus species by Natural History Museum entomologist Keita Matsumoto in 2021, using a male specimen gathered in 1953 by Harry George Champion in Haldwani, India. C. tardarsauceae was grouped into the C. testudo species group, distinguished from related species by the shape of its parameres (external male genitalia) and the median lobe of its aedeagus (male genital organ). It was named for Tardar Sauce (Grumpy Cat), a cat popular in internet memes.

== Taxonomy ==
The Limnichidae (minute marsh-loving beetle) genus Caccothryptus was first described by David Sharp in 1902. Native to southern and eastern Asia, Caccothryptus beetles generally live in forests, inside piles of water-logged dead wood adjacent to small streams. In 2014, the genus was divided into five species groups by entomologists Carles Hernando and Ignacio Ribera. A group named for C. testudo is distinguished by its separated parameres (part of the external genitalia of males), and—unlike the C. compactus group—the lack of a long longitudinal furrow along the median lobe of the aedeagus (male reproductive organ), alongside a lack of differentiation between the anterior claws on males. Many members of the C. testudo group are native to the Himalayas of Nepal and northern India, although others have been found in China, Vietnam and Thailand.

A group of Caccothryptus specimens were collected in 1953 by forester Harry George Champion in the Haldwani division of the Kumaon Himalayas, India. These were labeled as C. ripicola and C. testudo, which George Charles Champion had described in 1923. These were stored at the British Natural History Museum. In 2021, Natural History Museum entomologist Keita Matsumoto identified a number of distinct species from these specimens. A male specimen was designated the holotype for Caccothryptus tardarsauceae, with no paratypes. C. tardarsauceae was placed in the species group C. testudo and named for Tardar Sauce (also known as Grumpy Cat), a cat popular in internet memes. It can be distinguished from other C. testudo group species by the narrowing of the median lobe of its aedeagus and the V-shaped notches on its parameres when viewed from below, as well as the presence of a concave structure with a gently-pointed end between the parameres.

== Description ==
Caccothryptus tardarsauceae has a brown, elongated oval body, with reddish-brown tibiae (penultimate leg segment) and light brown tarsal claws. The upper side of its body is covered with dense patches of long, white setae forming wavy patterns. The bottom side also has relatively long setae. Its head is partially retracted into its pronotum (top plate of the prothorax), and has a generally smooth surface interrupted by many small punctures or indentations. Its antenna segments are long and slender, while its elytra are long, wavy, and covered with a mix of small and medium-sized punctures. The surface, besides the puncturse, is smooth and shiny, with elytral striae (stripes) visible at the sides. Its tarsal claws are long, narrow, and symmetrical.

The aedeagus is elongated and heavily sclerotised (hardened by sclerotin), with an asymmetrical base. The median lobe of the aedeagus is about a third of the length of the total genitalia, longer than its parameres. The lobe gently curves upwards, narrowing to a rounded point when viewed from below. The parameres have wide, V-shaped notches at their tips, and when viewed from the side have bisinuate (creating two arcs) top edges. They are connected by a long, concave structure with a gently pointed end. No female specimens are known.
