= Liparetrus cognatus =

Scientific classification
- Kingdom: Animalia
- Phylum: Arthropoda
- Clade: Pancrustacea
- Class: Insecta
- Order: Coleoptera
- Suborder: Polyphaga
- Infraorder: Scarabaeiformia
- Family: Scarabaeidae
- Genus: Liparetrus
- Species: L. cognatus

Binomial name
- Liparetrus cognatus Britton, 1980

Species of beetle

Liparetrus cognatus is a species of beetle of the family Scarabaeidae. It is found in Australia (Western Australia).

== Taxonomy ==
This species belongs to the capillatus species group. The defining characters of this group include the absence of setae on the disc of the pronotum, although sometimes scales are present.

== Description ==
Adults reach a length of about 5.5 mm (0.22 in). They are similar to Liparetrus laevis, but may be distinguished by the partly or wholly reddish yellow pronotum, the shape of the aedeagus, and the elytra which are darkened only at the base.
