= Physemus minutus =

Scientific classification
- Domain: Eukaryota
- Kingdom: Animalia
- Phylum: Arthropoda
- Class: Insecta
- Order: Coleoptera
- Suborder: Polyphaga
- Infraorder: Elateriformia
- Family: Limnichidae
- Genus: Physemus
- Species: P. minutus

Binomial name
- Physemus minutus Leconte, 1854

Species of beetle

Physemus minutus is a species of minute marsh-loving beetle in the family Limnichidae. It is found in Central America and North America.
