= Henry Champion =

Henry Champion may refer to:

- Henry Champion (general) (1751–1836), American general
- Henry Hyde Champion (1859–1928), social reformer and journalist

== See also ==
- Harry Champion (1866–1942), stage name of the music hall performer
- Harry George Champion (1891–1979), forest officer in British India
