= Throscinus politus =

Scientific classification
- Kingdom: Animalia
- Phylum: Arthropoda
- Class: Insecta
- Order: Coleoptera
- Suborder: Polyphaga
- Infraorder: Elateriformia
- Family: Limnichidae
- Genus: Throscinus
- Species: T. politus

Binomial name
- Throscinus politus Casey, 1889

Species of beetle

Throscinus politus is a species of minute marsh-loving beetle in the family Limnichidae. It is found in North America.
