= Limnichites punctatus =

Scientific classification
- Domain: Eukaryota
- Kingdom: Animalia
- Phylum: Arthropoda
- Class: Insecta
- Order: Coleoptera
- Suborder: Polyphaga
- Infraorder: Elateriformia
- Family: Limnichidae
- Genus: Limnichites
- Species: L. punctatus

Binomial name
- Limnichites punctatus (LeConte, 1854)

Synonyms
- Limnichus austinianus Casey, 1912; Limnichus punctatus LeConte, 1854

Species of beetle

Limnichites punctatus is a species of minute marsh-loving beetle in the family Limnichidae. It is found in North America.
