= Limnichoderus ovatus =

Scientific classification
- Kingdom: Animalia
- Phylum: Arthropoda
- Class: Insecta
- Order: Coleoptera
- Suborder: Polyphaga
- Infraorder: Elateriformia
- Family: Limnichidae
- Genus: Limnichoderus
- Species: L. ovatus

Binomial name
- Limnichoderus ovatus (LeConte, 1854)

Synonyms
- Limnichus ovatus Casey, 1889; Limnichus pulvereus LeConte, 1854

Species of beetle

Limnichoderus ovatus is a species of beetle in Limnichidae, a family with the vernacular name "minute marsh-loving beetles".

As the name suggests, Limnichoderus ovatus tends to be found in or near marsh biomes. It is found in Central and North America, primarily in the Southern United States and Mexico.
