= Neoserica lateriuncinata =

Scientific classification
- Kingdom: Animalia
- Phylum: Arthropoda
- Class: Insecta
- Order: Coleoptera
- Suborder: Polyphaga
- Infraorder: Scarabaeiformia
- Family: Scarabaeidae
- Genus: Neoserica
- Species: N. lateriuncinata

Binomial name
- Neoserica lateriuncinata Ahrens, Fabrizi & Liu, 2014

Species of beetle

Neoserica lateriuncinata is a species of beetle of the family Scarabaeidae. It is found in Sichuan, China.

== Description ==
Adults reach a length of about 9.3–9.4 mm. They have a light reddish brown, oblong body. The antennae are yellow and the dorsal surface has a slightly iridescent shine and is nearly glabrous.

== Etymology ==
The specific name is derived from Latin latus- (meaning "side") and uncinatus (meaning "hook-shaped") and refers to its lateral hook of the phallobase (base of the aedeagus).
