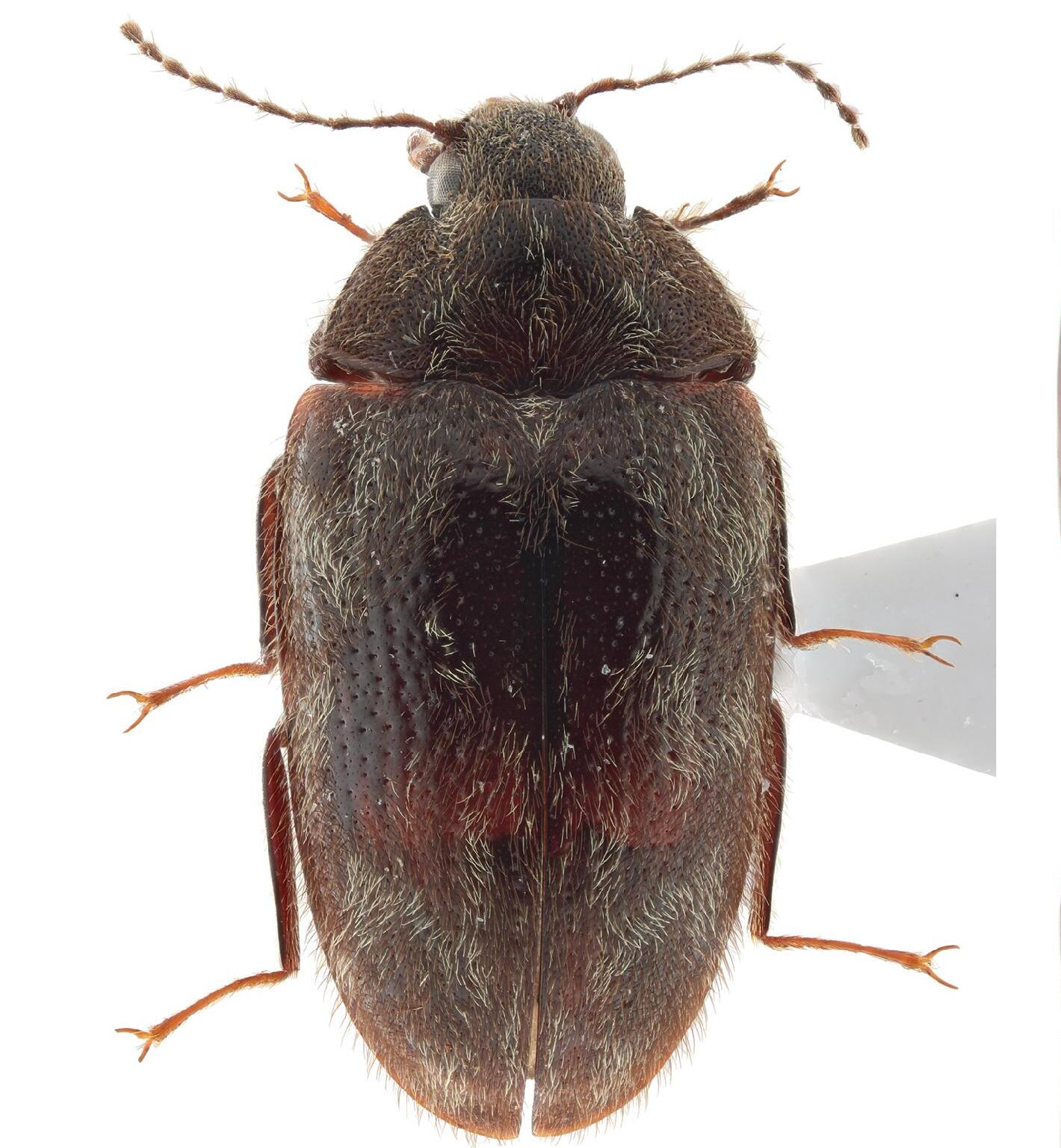

Scientific classification
- Kingdom: Animalia
- Phylum: Arthropoda
- Clade: Pancrustacea
- Class: Insecta
- Order: Coleoptera
- Suborder: Polyphaga
- Infraorder: Elateriformia
- Family: Limnichidae
- Genus: Caccothryptus
- Species: C. arakawae

Binomial name
- Caccothryptus arakawae Matsumoto, 2021

= Caccothryptus arakawae =

Species of beetle

Caccothryptus arakawae is a species of minute marsh-loving beetle in the subfamily Limnichinae. The species was described alongside five other Caccothryptus species by Natural History Museum entomologist Keita Matsumoto in 2021, using specimens gathered by Martin J. D. Brendell at Kathmandu, Nepal in 1983. Six of Brendell's specimens were distinguished from the initial classification of Caccothryptus testudo due to distinct genital structures. The species was named for Japanese manga artist Hiromu Arakawa.

== Taxonomy ==
The Limnichidae (minute marsh-loving beetle) genus Caccothryptus was first described by David Sharp in 1902. Native to southern and eastern Asia, Caccothryptus beetles generally live in forests, inside piles of water-logged dead wood adjacent to small streams. In 2014, the genus was divided into five species groups by Carles Hernando and Ignacio Ribera. A group named for C. testudo is distinguished by its separated parameres (part of the external genitalia of males), and—unlike the C. compactus group—the lack of a long longitudinal furrow along the median lobe of the aedeagus (male reproductive organ), alongside a lack of differentiation between the anterior claws on males. Many members of the C. testudo group are native to the Himalayas of Nepal and northern India, although others have been found in China, Vietnam and Thailand.

A group of Caccothryptus specimens were collected in 1983 in Kathmandu, Nepal by Martin J. D. Brendell, curator of the Coleoptera Department of Entomology at the Natural History Museum, London. These were labeled as C. ripicola and C. testudo, first described by George Charles Champion in 1923. They were stored at the Natural History Museum. In 2021, museum entomologist Keita Matsumoto identified a number of distinct species from these specimens. A male specimen from Kathmandu was labeled as the holotype for Caccothryptus arakawae. Five specimens (comprising three males and two females) were labeled paratypes. C. arakawae was placed in the species group C. testudo and named for Japanese manga artist Hiromu Arakawa.

== Description ==
The C. arakawae specimens identified by Matsumoto have elytra ranging from 3.39–3.68 mm in length, and 2.35–2.52 mm in width. Their prothoraces (the frontmost thorax segments) are 0.90–1 mm in length and 2.03–2.11 mm in width. C. arakawae has an elongated oval body, brown in color except for reddish tibiae, which are distributed across both the upper and lower sides of the body. The setae on the upper side are long and white, and densely concentrated into wavy patterns. The setae on the underside of the body are somewhat shorter, but still relatively long.

Its tarsi (the last portion of the leg) are divided into five segments of increasing length, with the fifth segment as long as the others combined. It has long, narrow, light brown tarsal claws. The beetle's head, smooth and punctured, is slightly retracted into its pronotum, and features eleven-segmented antennae. Little sexual dimorphism exists between males and females, beyond a longer fifth abdominal ventrite on the female.

The beetle's male genitals display a number of differences from other species in the C. testudo group. The aedeagus is elongated and highly sclerotized (hardened by sclerotin), with a median lobe about two-fifths of the length of the genitalia, longer than the parameres. This lobe narrows to a slightly pointed tip. The parameres are separated by a deep, rounded indentation, while the parameres' tips have V-shaped notches separated by a U-shaped depression. Their upper sides are wavy, forming two concave curves. Females have a long ovipositor and pointed gonocoxites (structures covering the underside of the genitals).
