= Liparetrus gilvus =

Scientific classification
- Kingdom: Animalia
- Phylum: Arthropoda
- Clade: Pancrustacea
- Class: Insecta
- Order: Coleoptera
- Suborder: Polyphaga
- Infraorder: Scarabaeiformia
- Family: Scarabaeidae
- Genus: Liparetrus
- Species: L. gilvus

Binomial name
- Liparetrus gilvus Britton, 1980

Species of beetle

Liparetrus gilvus is a species of beetle of the family Scarabaeidae. It is found in Australia (Northern Territory).

== Taxonomy ==
This species belongs to the monticola species group.

== Description ==
Adults reach a length of about 4.5 mm (0.18 in). They are similar to Liparetrus atomus, but may be distinguished by the form of the aedeagus.
