= Lichminus =

Scientific classification
- Kingdom: Animalia
- Phylum: Arthropoda
- Class: Insecta
- Order: Coleoptera
- Suborder: Polyphaga
- Infraorder: Elateriformia
- Family: Limnichidae
- Subfamily: Limnichinae
- Genus: Lichminus; Casey, 1889

Genus of beetles

Lichminus is a genus of minute marsh-loving beetles in the family Limnichidae. There is one described species in Lichminus, L. tenuicornis.
