= Throscinus =

Scientific classification
- Domain: Eukaryota
- Kingdom: Animalia
- Phylum: Arthropoda
- Class: Insecta
- Order: Coleoptera
- Suborder: Polyphaga
- Infraorder: Elateriformia
- Family: Limnichidae
- Genus: Throscinus; LeConte, 1874

Genus of beetles

Throscinus is a genus of minute marsh-loving beetles in the family Limnichidae. There are about eight described species in Throscinus.

== Species ==
These eight species belong to the genus Throscinus:

- Throscinus aethiops Darlington, 1936
- Throscinus crotchi LeConte, 1874
- Throscinus politus Casey, 1889
- Throscinus punctatus Wooldridge, 1981
- Throscinus schwarzi Schaeffer, 1904
- Throscinus schwarzii Schaeffer, 1904
- Throscinus simplex Wooldridge, 1981
- Throscinus spangleri Wooldridge, 1981
