= Limnichites =

Scientific classification
- Kingdom: Animalia
- Phylum: Arthropoda
- Class: Insecta
- Order: Coleoptera
- Suborder: Polyphaga
- Infraorder: Elateriformia
- Family: Limnichidae
- Subfamily: Limnichinae
- Genus: Limnichites; Casey, 1889

Genus of beetles

Limnichites is a genus of minute marsh-loving beetles in the family Limnichidae. There are about 15 described species in Limnichites.

== Species ==
These 15 species belong to the genus Limnichites:

- Limnichites austinianus Casey
- Limnichites browni Wooldridge, 1977
- Limnichites confertus (Sharp, 1902)
- Limnichites densissimus Casey
- Limnichites foraminosus Casey, 1912
- Limnichites huronicus Casey, 1912
- Limnichites imparatus Wooldridge, 1977
- Limnichites nebulosus (LeConte, 1879)
- Limnichites olivaceus (LeConte, 1854)
- Limnichites perforatus (Casey, 1889)
- Limnichites porrectus Wooldridge, 1977
- Limnichites punctatus (LeConte, 1854)
- Limnichites rudis Wooldridge, 1977
- Limnichites simplex Wooldridge, 1977
- Limnichites virginicus Casey
