= Mexico (beetle) =

Scientific classification
- Kingdom: Animalia
- Phylum: Arthropoda
- Class: Insecta
- Order: Coleoptera
- Suborder: Polyphaga
- Infraorder: Elateriformia
- Family: Limnichidae
- Subfamily: Thaumastodinae
- Genus: Mexico; Spilman, 1972

Species
- 2, see text

Genus of beetles

Mexico is a small genus of beetles, containing two species. They belong to subfamily Thaumastodinae, the jumping shore beetles.

The type species, Mexico litoralis, is native to the west coast of Mexico. Mexico morrisoni, described in 2005, is from the Bahamas. Both beetles are minute, measuring about 2 millimeters in length.
