= Ovipore =

Female reproductive organ in arthropods

An ovipore is a pore-like sexual organ of a female insect that is inseminated by the spermatophores ejected by the aedeagus of a male insect during copulation. The spermatophores that pass through the ovipore are stored in most insect species in another organ called spermatheca.
