= Martinius (beetle) =

Scientific classification
- Domain: Eukaryota
- Kingdom: Animalia
- Phylum: Arthropoda
- Class: Insecta
- Order: Coleoptera
- Suborder: Polyphaga
- Infraorder: Elateriformia
- Family: Limnichidae
- Subfamily: Thaumastodinae
- Genus: Martinius; Spilman, 1959

Genus of beetles

Martinius is a genus of minute marsh-loving beetles in the family Limnichidae. There are at least three described species in Martinius.

== Species ==
- Martinius ripisaltator Spilman, 1966
- Martinius tellepontis Spilman, 1959
- Martinius temporalis Wooldridge, 1988
