= Physemus =

Scientific classification
- Domain: Eukaryota
- Kingdom: Animalia
- Phylum: Arthropoda
- Class: Insecta
- Order: Coleoptera
- Suborder: Polyphaga
- Infraorder: Elateriformia
- Family: Limnichidae
- Subfamily: Limnichinae
- Genus: Physemus; LeConte, 1854

Synonyms
- Ditaphrus Casey, 1886

Genus of beetles

Physemus is a genus of minute marsh beetles in the family Limnichidae. There are currently six described species.

== Species ==
These six species belong to the genus Physemus:

- Physemus excavatus Wooldridge, 1976^{i c g}
- Physemus latifrons Wooldridge, 1984^{i c g}
- Physemus levis Wooldridge, 1984^{i c g}
- Physemus minutus Leconte, 1854^{i c g b}
- Physemus mirus Wooldridge, 1984^{i c g}
- Physemus punctatus Wooldridge, 1976^{i c g}

Data sources: i = ITIS, c = Catalogue of Life, g = GBIF, b = Bugguide.net
