= Daweishan ICCA =

The Daweishan ICCA, located in southeastern Yunnan province of China, has an intact rainforest which belongs to the Beibu-Gulf Center (one of the three biodiversity centers in China) and Indo-Burma hotspot (one of the 34 biodiversity hot-spots worldwide). To better protect this rainforest with unique and rich species diversity, the People's Government of Yunnan Province expanded Daweishan Nature Reserve in 1996 to incorporate Huayudong Forest, Xiaoweishan Forest, Zuantianpo Forest, Dalaobaijing Forest and Honghe Cycas Reserve. In 2001, the Chinese State Council officially approved Daweishan as a National Nature Reserve.

Daweishan National Nature Reserve crosses Pingbian, Hekou, Mengzi and Gejiu counties with the total area of 439 square kilometer. The elevation of the reserve is varied from 100 meter to 2365 meter. Daweishan has the only humid rainforest in the mainland of China and has a complete tropical mountain forest ecosystem vertical profile. From the bottom to the top, there are tropical humid rainforest, montane rainforest, monsoon evergreen broad-leaved forest, mossy evergreen broad-leaved forest and mossy dwarf forest. Daweishan has extremely rich biodiversity which has 12 Grade I National Protected Plants, 23 Grade II National Protected Plants, 12 Grade I National Protected Animals and 46 Grade II National Protected Animals.

Within Daweishan Reserve, especially in the core zone of the reserve, there are some villages habitat with Yi, Miao and other ethnic groups. These people's life highly depends on the forest and with the increasing population and social-economic development, the pressures on the forest is also increasing. Deforesting, ecological degradation, wild species disappearing still happened. However, as the village's land did not belong to the reserve and the community did not regulate their activities, there are frequently conflicts between the survival and protection which caused negative impacts to the long term biodiversity conservation.

Under the support of UNDP and GEF/SGP, Nature Conservation Association of Pingbian launched the “Construction of Daweishan ICCA” project in October 2013. The project was carried out in the 3 villages locating in the core zone of Daweishan reserve, i.e. Malongdi, Ludima and Changpo Village, which has direct and significant impacts on the reserve and its biodiversity. The overall objectives of this project were 1) Raise the 3 project villages’ awareness on protection and enhance their capacity on sustainable development, 2) effectively protect forest and biodiversity through develop sustainable livelihood and clean energy, and 3) register ICCA and develop co-management mechanisms between the communities and reserve administration bureau.

Major activities included village conference, training (on biodiversity, beekeeping and product certification, biogas use and clean energy, and ICCA registration), publicity activities, registration of beekeeping cooperative and ICCA, community patrol and biodiversity image monitoring, community protection actions, and biogas construction.

Through the first and second village conference, biodiversity and ICCA training, community committee operation, patrol and biodiversity monitoring, the 3 villages’ awareness and capacity on protection were significantly raised. Villagers understand ICCA concept, they agreed to registered ICCA and make protection actions. In September 2014 the 3 villages signed “Free, Prior and Informed Consent” and complete the registered form/case study together with project team. In December 2014 we complete the ICCA registration which means the Daweishan ICCA was formal established.
