= Liparetrus laevis =

Scientific classification
- Kingdom: Animalia
- Phylum: Arthropoda
- Clade: Pancrustacea
- Class: Insecta
- Order: Coleoptera
- Suborder: Polyphaga
- Infraorder: Scarabaeiformia
- Family: Scarabaeidae
- Genus: Liparetrus
- Species: L. laevis

Binomial name
- Liparetrus laevis Blanchard, 1850

Synonyms
- Liparetrus nigriclavus Lea, 1917; Liparetrus agrestis Blackburn, 1888; Liparetrus nigriceps MacLeay, 1886

Species of beetle

Liparetrus laevis is a species of beetle of the family Scarabaeidae. It is found in Australia (Western Australia).

== Taxonomy ==
This species belongs to the capillatus species group. The defining characters of this group include the absence of setae on the disc of the pronotum, although sometimes scales are present.

== Description ==
Adults reach a length of about 6 mm (0.24 in). The head, pronotum, ventral surface and base of the abdomen are black, while the elytra are light yellowish brown with black margins. The propygidium and pygidium are pale reddish yellow.
