= Limnichoderus =

Scientific classification
- Kingdom: Animalia
- Phylum: Arthropoda
- Class: Insecta
- Order: Coleoptera
- Suborder: Polyphaga
- Infraorder: Elateriformia
- Family: Limnichidae
- Subfamily: Limnichinae
- Genus: Limnichoderus; Casey, 1889

Genus of beetles

Limnichoderus is a genus of minute marsh-loving beetles in the family Limnichidae. There are at least 20 described species in Limnichoderus.

== Species ==
- Limnichoderus amoenus Wooldridge, 1981
- Limnichoderus angustus Wooldridge, 1981
- Limnichoderus barberi Wooldridge, 1981
- Limnichoderus conspectus Wooldridge, 1981
- Limnichoderus cupidus Wooldridge, 1981
- Limnichoderus curtulus Sharp, 1902
- Limnichoderus durus Wooldridge, 1981
- Limnichoderus excelsus Wooldridge, 1981
- Limnichoderus fragosus Wooldridge, 1981
- Limnichoderus imprioris Blackwelder, 1944
- Limnichoderus insularis Wooldridge, 1981
- Limnichoderus lutrochinus (LeConte, 1879)
- Limnichoderus magnus Wooldridge, 1981
- Limnichoderus modicus Wooldridge, 1981
- Limnichoderus moratus Wooldridge, 1981
- Limnichoderus naviculatus (Casey, 1889)
- Limnichoderus ovatus (LeConte, 1854)
- Limnichoderus placidus Wooldridge, 1987
- Limnichoderus plenus Wooldridge, 1981
- Limnichoderus punctiventris (Casey, 1889)
- Limnichoderus seclusus Wooldridge, 1987
- Limnichoderus seriatus (Casey, 1889)
- Limnichoderus similis Wooldridge, 1981
- Limnichoderus vicinus Pic, 1922
