= Sclerosis =

Sclerosis (also sclerosus in the Latin names of a few disorders) is a hardening of tissue and other anatomical features. It may refer to:

- Sclerosis (medicine), a hardening of tissue
- in zoology, a process, sclerotization, which forms sclerites, a hardened exoskeleton
- in botany, a process which hardens plant tissue by adding fibers and sclereids, resulting in sclerenchyma
- in economics, eurosclerosis
