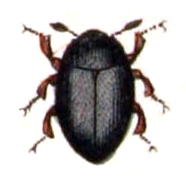
- Limnichus pygmaeus

Scientific classification
- Kingdom: Animalia
- Phylum: Arthropoda
- Clade: Pancrustacea
- Class: Insecta
- Order: Coleoptera
- Suborder: Polyphaga
- Infraorder: Elateriformia
- Family: Limnichidae
- Subfamily: Limnichinae
- Genus: Limnichus; Latreille, 1829

= Limnichus =

Genus of beetles

Limnichus is a genus of beetles belonging to the family Limnichidae.

== Species ==
According to the Catalogue of Life, Limnichus has 54 species:

- Limnichus aeneipennis Pic, 1935
- Limnichus africanus Pic, 1923
- Limnichus angustulus Weise, 1877
- Limnichus astruci Pic, 1922
- Limnichus ater Lea, 1920
- Limnichus aurosericus Jacquelin du Val, 1857
- Limnichus australis Erichson, 1842
- Limnichus brevior Fairmaire, 1898
- Limnichus coomani Pic, 1935
- Limnichus cuneatus Champion, 1923
- Limnichus curtus Pic, 1922
- Limnichus decorus Broun, 1880
- Limnichus demoulini Delève, 1968
- Limnichus ellipticus Lea, 1920
- Limnichus falsus Delève, 1971
- Limnichus fragilicornis Wollaston, 1868
- Limnichus fulvopubens Pic, 1922
- Limnichus globosus Champion, 1923
- Limnichus incanus Kiesenwetter, 1851
- Limnichus inornatus Weise, 1877
- Limnichus javanicus Pic, 1922
- Limnichus latiusculus Reitter, 1901
- Limnichus lederi Weise, 1877
- Limnichus lewisi Nakane, 1963
- Limnichus longitarsis Champion, 1923
- Limnichus marmoratus Fairmaire, 1898
- Limnichus mateui Hernando & Ribera, 1998
- Limnichus micraspis Champion, 1923
- Limnichus monticola Delève, 1968
- Limnichus nigripes Broun, 1893
- Limnichus obliteratus Champion, 1923
- Limnichus palawanus Delève, 1973
- Limnichus picinus Broun, 1881
- Limnichus pruinosus Fleischer, 1909
- Limnichus pumilio Obenberger, 1916
- Limnichus punctatus Broun, 1880
- Limnichus punctipennis Kraatz, 1858
- Limnichus pygmaeus (Sturm, 1807)
- Limnichus ruficolor Pic, 1935
- Limnichus rufipes Pic, 1932
- Limnichus rufulopubens Fairmaire, 1897
- Limnichus rufus Pic, 1923
- Limnichus saegeri Delève, 1968
- Limnichus sericeus (Duftschmid, 1825)
- Limnichus subchalybeus Reitter, 1881
- Limnichus subelongatus Pic, 1922
- Limnichus subnotatus Champion, 1923
- Limnichus sulcatulus Pic, 1922
- Limnichus tonkineus Fairmaire, 1888
- Limnichus trachyformis Pic, 1922
- Limnichus turkestanicus Pic, 1905
- Limnichus unistriatus Champion, 1923
- Limnichus vagegluttatus Fairmaire, 1898
- Limnichus waelbroecki Delève, 1968
