= Harry George Champion =

British botanist (1891–1979)

Harry George Champion CIE
- Born: 17 August 1891
- Died: 20 June 1979 (aged 87)
- Scientific career
- Fields: Botany

Sir Harry George Champion CIE (17 August 1891 – 20 June 1979) was a geographer and forest officer in British India who created a classification of the forest types of India and Burma.

== Early life ==
Champion was the son of British entomologist George Charles Champion. He studied at New College, Oxford, and obtained a degree in chemistry in 1912 and then studied botany and forestry under William Schlich.

== Career ==
He joined the Indian Forest Service in 1915 and became a silviculturist at the Forest Research Institute at Dehradun staying there until 1936 before becoming a Conservator in the United Provinces. He left India in 1939 and became a Professor of Forestry at Oxford, succeeding Robert Scott Troup. Troup had offered him a position at the Imperial Forestry Institute in 1924 but Champion chose not to join it. He married Troup's secretary Crystal Parsons.

== Forest classification ==
Champion published an initial classification of the forest types of India and Burma in 1936. This was revised in 1968 by S K. Seth and this is referred to as the Champion and Seth classification of the forest types of India. His younger brother F. W. Champion was also a forester in India and a pioneer in wildlife photography.
