= Sclerotin =

Component of insect cuticles and exoskeletons

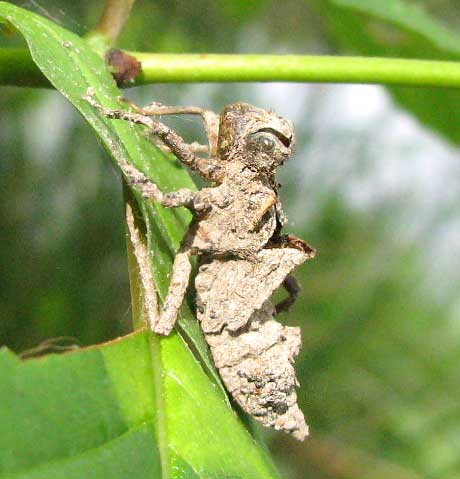
Insect exoskeleton (comprising sclerotin): abandoned exuviae of a dragonfly

Sclerotin is a component of the cuticle of various Arthropoda, most familiarly insects. It is formed by cross-linking members of particular classes of protein molecules, a biochemical process called sclerotization, a form of tanning in which quinones are enzymatically introduced into the cuticle, and react with terminal and side chain–related amino groups in the proteins to form strong links between the molecules. The resulting material greatly increases the rigidity of an insect's chitinous exoskeleton, which is otherwise fairly soft. It is particularly prominent in the thicker, armoured parts of insect and arachnid integument, such as in the biting mouthparts and sclerites of scorpions and beetles.

As it matures, freshly formed sclerotin becomes a hard, horn-like substance with a range of yellow-brown colors. As animals adapted to life on land, increasingly diverse needs for organic stiffening components arose (as opposed to mineral stiffening components such as calcium carbonates and phosphates). Among the invertebrates, this need was met largely by the development of sclerotins and other cross-linked proteins that allowed insects to adapt to existence on the land and later to develop wings.

Sclerotin is biochemically variable; different species incorporate different proteins in different proportions, and the same insect will use different compositions in forming the different components of its body. For example, a caterpillar may have sclerotized jaws, head capsule, and legs, with the rest of the body soft and membranous. In general, sclerotized cuticle is formed by cross-linking the various protein molecules with phenolic compounds – a tanning process under enzymatic control. In some of the Apterygota, however, at least some of the cross-linking is by disulphide bonds reminiscent of protein cross-linking in the formation of keratin. This has led many authors to refer to such cross-linked proteins in invertebrates as keratin, but modern analyses have shown that the term is inappropriate: keratins are a fairly well-defined set of proteins comprising particular chains in different proportions cross-linked in particular ways. Invertebrate connective tissue proteins based on disulphide links appear to be radically different.

== See also ==
- Sclerite
