= Caccothryptus compactus =

Scientific classification
- Kingdom: Animalia
- Phylum: Arthropoda
- Clade: Pancrustacea
- Class: Insecta
- Order: Coleoptera
- Suborder: Polyphaga
- Infraorder: Elateriformia
- Family: Limnichidae
- Genus: Caccothryptus
- Species: C. compactus

Binomial name
- Caccothryptus compactus Sharp, 1902

Species of beetle

Caccothryptus compactus is a species of minute marsh-loving beetle in the subfamily Limnichinae. The type species of the genus Caccothryptus, it was described by entomologist David Sharp in 1902 from a specimen collected at Martapura on Borneo. Quite large for its family, it has a black body covered in golden and silver setae. As part of a taxonomic revision of the genus in 2014, entomologists Carles Hernando and Ignacio Ribera grouped several other Caccothryptus species into the C. compactus species group, based on shared genitalia features. In addition to Borneo, C. compactus has been found in northern Sumatra and Southern Thailand.

== Taxonomy ==
In 1902, British entomologist David Sharp noticed similarities between the minute marsh-loving beetles of Central America and East Asia. He determined that, although closely related, the species were generally different enough to be placed in separate genera. He circumscribed two new genera of one species each from his East Asian beetle specimens—Manderisia and Caccothryptus—placing a third species into the Central American genus Cyphonicus. Writing that Caccothryptus was most similar in form to the Central American genus Enthryptus, he described the type species Caccothryptus compactus from a 4.5-millimetre-long (0.18 in) specimen collected at Martapura in southern Borneo, now part of Indonesia. He called C. compactus the "largest and most remarkable [of the minute marsh-loving beetles]". Sharp did not list an etymology for the species or genus in his description. Three new Caccothryptus species were described by George Charles Champion in 1923, who also reclassified the species of Maurice Pic's Macrobyrrhinus genus into Caccothryptus, stating that the two genera were synonyms. A lectotype for C. compactus was designated by David P. Wooldridge in 1990.

The entomologists Carles Hernando and Ignacio Ribera published a major taxonomic revision of the genus in 2014, classifying the beetles into five species groups based primarily on differences in genital anatomy. One of these groups was named for C. compactus, also including C. maculosus and the newly described species C. schuhi and C. sulawesianus. One species described by Champion, C. laosensis, was classified as a synonym for C. maculosus. This species group was identified for the shared features of dissimilar front claws on males (with the inner claw being longer and more curved), the presence of glandular pores on only the 4th sternite (abdomen segment), separated parameres (part of the external male genitalia), and a furrow running across the central lobe of the aedeagus (male genital organ). No other Caccothryptus species group has differences between its claws, while the presence of the other features vary between different groups. As of 2026, there are now 37 known Caccothryptus species, including 8 species in the C. compactus group.

== Description ==
Caccothryptus compactus has a black body, ranging from 4.6 to 5.0 millimetres (0.18 to 0.20 in) in length. Both the legs and the rather slender antennae are dark brown. Small serrations mark the meeting point of the antennae and the head. The head and pronotum (top plate of the prothorax) are covered in stark, dense and irregularly spaced indentations, with the pronotum having strongly bordered sides. Two layers of golden setae are found across the body. The elytra are covered with irregular dense indentations and golden setae, as well as poorly defined bands of silvery setae, described by Sharp as a "faint spotted appearance". The aedeagus is long, curved, and cylindrical. The tips of the median lobe of the aedeagus and the parameres are truncated when viewed from the side, with the paramere tips rounded when viewed from below.

Caccothryptus beetles generally live in forests, inside piles of water-logged dead wood adjacent to small streams. C. compactus specimens have been found at Martapura, Bukit Lawang in northern Sumatra, and at various locations in Southern Thailand, including Hat Yai, Khura Buri district, and Khao Sok National Park. One specimen from Luang Prabang, Laos, described by Champion in 1923, was reclassified in 2014 as C. maculosus.
