= Ignacio Ribera =

Spanish entomologist (1963–2020)

Ignacio Ribera Galán
- Born: March 9, 1963; Barcelona, Catalonia
- Died: April 15, 2020 (aged 57)
- Education: University of Barcelona; Spanish National Research Council
- Spouse: Alexandra Cieslak
- Children: 1
- Scientific career
- Fields: Entomology
- Workplaces: Spanish National Research Council

Ignacio “Nacho” Ribera Galán (9 March 1963 – 15 April 2020) was a Spanish entomologist who authored 104 species, 16 genera, 3 subgenera, and 1 family of beetles, along with two species of worms (Nematomorpha).

== Career ==
Born in Barcelona, Ignacio grew up in Martorell and was the second of six children. He graduated from the University of Barcelona in the 1980s with a degree in biology, followed by a PhD from the Spanish National Research Council. His PhD dissertation was titled "Estudio de los Hydradephaga (Coleoptera) del Pirineo y Prepirineo: morfometría y ecología." Throughout his early career, Ribera worked at the Scottish Agricultural College, University of Murcia, Natural History Museum, London, and the National Museum of Natural Sciences in Madrid. In 2008 he obtained a position at the Instituto de Biología Evolutiva (Spanish National Research Council), where he remained until his death.

As an entomologist, Ribera focused on the study of water and cave beetles, authoring numerous taxa in the families Dytiscidae, Hydraenidae, and Limnichidae, among others.

As of December 2020, eight species have been named for Ribera:

- Agabus riberae
- Boreonectes riberae
- Deronectes riberai
- Hydraena riberai
- Hydrophilonyces riberae
- Mayetia amicorum
- Paratyphlus riberai
- Trechus riberai

== Personal life ==
Ribera married Alexandria Cieslak on 8 June 2002 in Tarragona. Their only child, a son named Bernard, was born in July 2003. Ribera named Ochthebius bernard for his son and Agabus alexandrae for his wife.

Ribera suffered from kidney problems since the 1980s, requiring dialysis and multiple transplants, including one kidney from his father Andrés. His health rapidly deteriorated in April 2020, before dying on 15 April.
