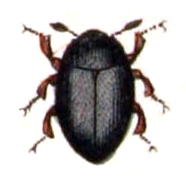
- Limnichus pygmaeus

Scientific classification
- Kingdom: Animalia
- Phylum: Arthropoda
- Clade: Pancrustacea
- Class: Insecta
- Order: Coleoptera
- Suborder: Polyphaga
- Infraorder: Elateriformia
- Family: Limnichidae
- Subfamily: Limnichinae; Erichson, 1846

= Limnichinae =

Subfamily of beetles

Limnichinae is a subfamily of minute marsh-loving beetles in the family Limnichidae. There are more than 20 genera and 330 described species in Limnichinae.

== Genera ==
These 25 genera belong to the subfamily Limnichinae:

- Afrolimnichus Delève, 1968
- Bothriophorus Mulsant & Rey, 1852
- Byrrhinus Motschulsky, 1858
- Caccothryptus Sharp, 1902
- Chibidoronus Satô, 1966
- Corrinea Wooldridge, 1980
- Cyclolimnichus Delève, 1968
- Eulimnichus Casey, 1889
- Euthryptus Sharp, 1902
- Geolimnichus Hernando & Ribera, 2003
- Lichminus Casey, 1889
- Limnichites Casey, 1889
- Limnichoderus Casey, 1889
- Limnichomorphus Pic, 1922
- Limnichus Latreille, 1829
- Mandersia Sharp, 1902
- Paralimnichus Delève, 1973
- Pelochares Mulsant & Rey, 1869
- Phalacrichus Sharp, 1902
- Physemus LeConte, 1854
- Platypelochares Champion, 1923
- Pseudothryptus Hernando & Ribera, 2005
- Resachus Delève, 1968
- Simplocarina Pic, 1922
- Tricholimnichus Hernando & Ribera, 2001
