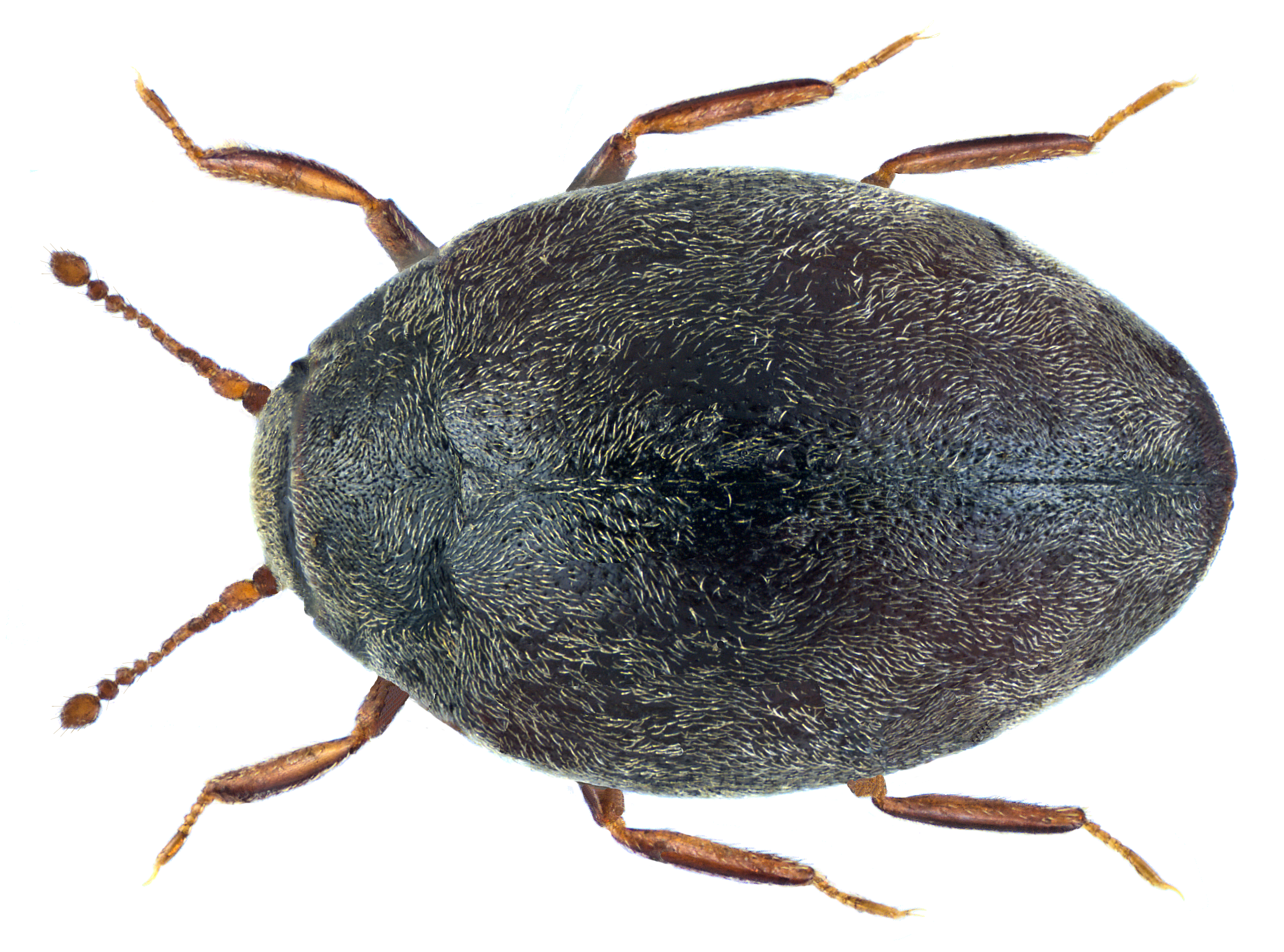
- Limnichus pygmaeus

Scientific classification
- Kingdom: Animalia
- Phylum: Arthropoda
- Clade: Pancrustacea
- Class: Insecta
- Order: Coleoptera
- Suborder: Polyphaga
- Infraorder: Elateriformia
- Superfamily: Byrrhoidea
- Family: Limnichidae; Erichson, 1846

Subfamilies
- Cephalobyrrhinae Champion, 1925; Hyphalinae Britton, 1971; Limnichinae Erichson, 1846; Thaumastodinae Champion, 1924

= Limnichidae =

Limnichidae Temporal range: Cenomanian–Recent

Family of beetles

Limnichidae, commonly called minute marsh-loving beetles, is a family of beetles belonging to Byrrhoidea. There are at least 30 genera and 350 described species in Limnichidae. They are found worldwide, with the greatest diversity in tropical regions. Most species seem to be associated with water-adjacent habitats, such as riparian and coastal locations, though many species are likely fully terrestrial, with some species being associated with leaf litter and arboreal habitats. Species with known diets feed on moss or algae. The oldest fossils of the family are known from mid-Cretaceous Burmese amber from Myanmar.

== Genera ==
- Acontosceles Champion, 1924
- Afrolimnichus Delève, 1968
- Babalimnichus Satô, 1994
- Bothriophorus Mulsant and Rey, 1852
- Byrrhinus Motschulsky, 1858
- Caccothryptus Sharp, 1902
- Cephalobyrrhinus Pic, 1922
- Cephalobyrrhus Pic, 1923
- Chibidoronus Satô, 1966
- Corrinea Wooldridge, 1980
- Cyclolimnichus Delève, 1968
- Erichia Reitter, 1895
- Ersachus Erichson, 1847
- Eulimnichus Casey, 1889
- Euthryptus Sharp, 1902
- Geolimnichus Hernando and Ribera, 2003
- Hyphalus Britton, 1971
- Lichminus Casey, 1889
- Limnichites Casey, 1889
- Limnichoderus Casey, 1889
- Limnichomorphus Pic, 1922
- Limnichus Latreille, 1829
- Mandersia Sharp, 1902
- Martinius Spilman, 1959
- Mexico Spilman, 1972
- Palaeoersachus Pütz, Hernando and Ribera, 2004
- Paralimnichus Delève, 1973
- Parathroscinus Wooldridge, 1984
- Pelochares Mulsant and Rey, 1869
- Phalacrichus Sharp, 1902
- Physemus LeConte, 1854
- Platypelochares Champion, 1923
- Pseudeucinetus Heller, 1921
- Pseudothryptus Hernando and Ribera, 2005
- Resachus Delève, 1968
- Simplocarina Pic, 1922
- Throscinus LeConte, 1874
- Tricholimnichus Hernando and Ribera, 2001
