= Aedeagus =

Reproductive organ of male arthropods

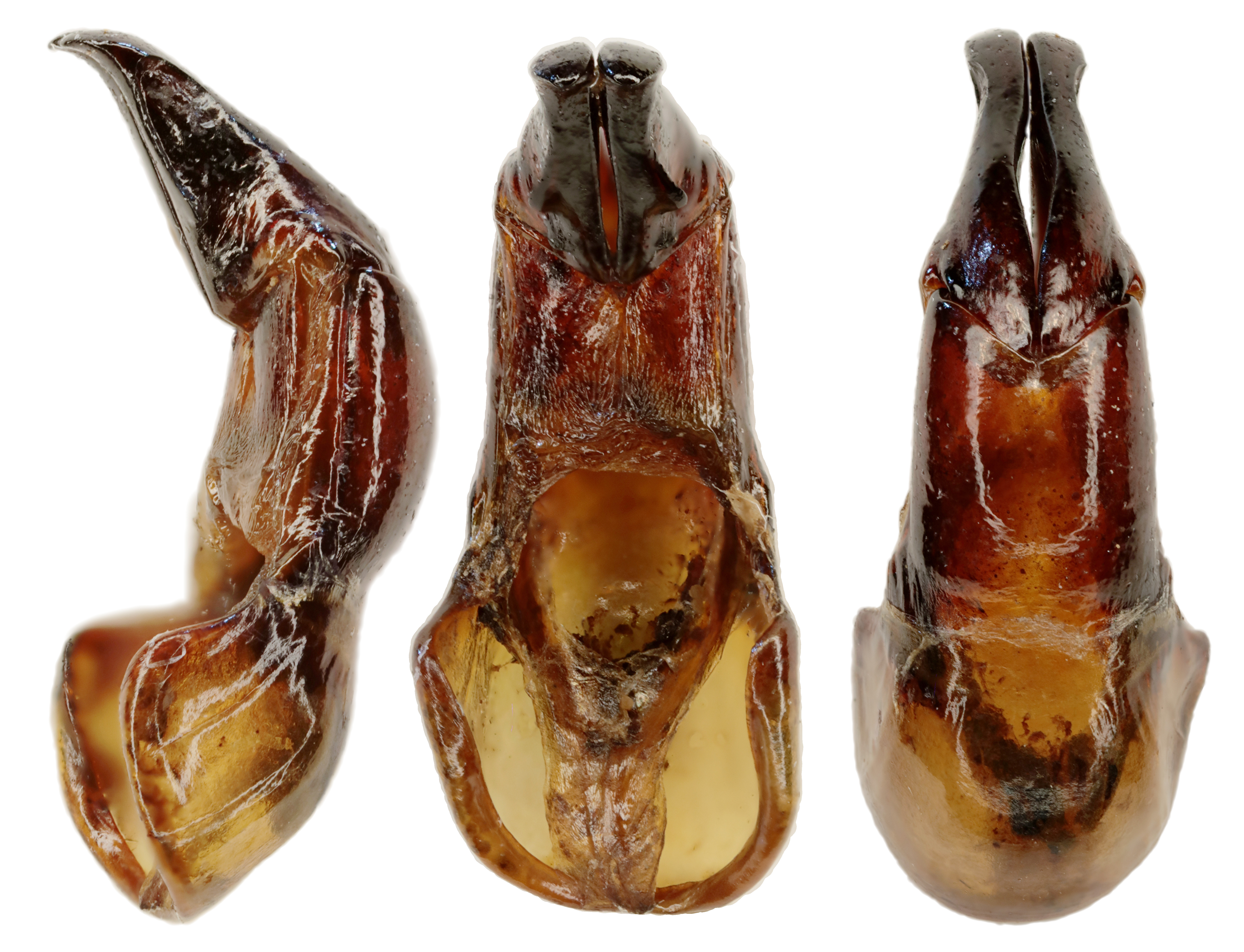
Aedeagus of Pentodon idiota

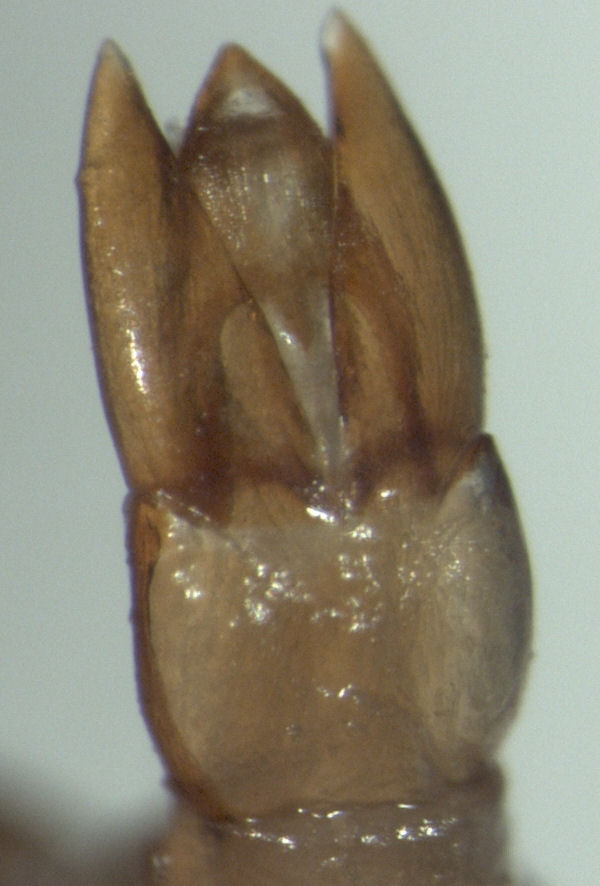
Photomicrograph of the aedeagus of water scavenger beetle Tormissus linsi (from above)

An aedeagus (/iˈdi.ə.ɡəs/ or /i.diˈeɪ.ɡəs/ pl. aedeagi) is a reproductive organ of male arthropods through which they secrete sperm from the testes during copulation with a female. It can be thought of as the insect equivalent of a mammal's penis, though the comparison is fairly loose given the greater complexity of insect reproduction. The term is derived from Ancient Greek αἰδοῖα (aidoia) 'private parts' and ἀγός (agos) 'leader'.

The aedeagus is part of the male's abdomen, which is the hindmost of the three major body sections of an insect. The pair of testes of the insect are connected to the aedeagus through the genital ducts. The aedeagus is part of the male insect's phallus, a complex and often species-specific arrangement of more or less sclerotized (hardened) flaps and hooks which also includes in some species the valvae (clasper), which are paired organs which help the male hold on to the female during copulation. During copulation, the aedeagus connects with the ovipore of a female. The aedeagus can be quite pronounced or de minimis.

The base of the aedeagus may be the partially sclerotized phallotheca, also called the phallosoma or theca. In some species the phallotheca contains a space, called the endosoma (internal holding pouch), into which the tip end of the aedeagus may be withdrawn (retracted). The vas deferens is sometimes drawn into (folded into) the phallotheca together with a seminal vesicle.

In some arthropods, sperm is not passed to the female as liquid with free-swimming spermatozoa, but as capsules called spermatophores in which the actual spermatozoa are enclosed. In addition to the spermatophores, in some species the aedeagus also discharges a spermatophylax, a ball of nutritious secretions, as a nuptial gift to aid the female in producing offspring.

In males of most species of Lepidoptera, the aedeagus has a sheath which is supported by an organ called the juxta, which is located between the aforementioned valvae.

== See also ==
- Pedipalp § Spider pedipalps for spermatophore transfer in arachnids
