= Liparetrus obscurior =

Scientific classification
- Kingdom: Animalia
- Phylum: Arthropoda
- Clade: Pancrustacea
- Class: Insecta
- Order: Coleoptera
- Suborder: Polyphaga
- Infraorder: Scarabaeiformia
- Family: Scarabaeidae
- Genus: Liparetrus
- Species: L. obscurior

Binomial name
- Liparetrus obscurior Lea, 1917

Species of beetle

Liparetrus obscurior is a species of beetle of the family Scarabaeidae. It is found in Australia (Western Australia).

== Taxonomy ==
This species belongs to the striatus species group. The defining characters of this group include the absence of setae on the disc of the pronotum and scales or flattened, adpressed setae on the propygidium and usually also the pygidium.

== Description ==
Adults reach a length of about 7–8 mm (0.28–0.31 in). They are very similar to Liparetrus striatus, but the body and legs are black and the elytra are sometimes dark brown on the disc. Furthermore, the surface is slightly iridescent.
