= Liparetrus flavipennis =

Scientific classification
- Kingdom: Animalia
- Phylum: Arthropoda
- Clade: Pancrustacea
- Class: Insecta
- Order: Coleoptera
- Suborder: Polyphaga
- Infraorder: Scarabaeiformia
- Family: Scarabaeidae
- Genus: Liparetrus
- Species: L. flavipennis

Binomial name
- Liparetrus flavipennis Lea, 1917

Species of beetle

Liparetrus flavipennis is a species of beetle of the family Scarabaeidae. It is found in Australia (South Australia, Victoria).

== Taxonomy ==
This species belongs to the luridipennis species group. The defining characters of this group include setae on the disc of the pronotum.

== Description ==
Adults reach a length of about 5.5 mm (0.22 in). They are very similar to Liparetrus vestitus, but may be distinguished by the presence of one (instead of two) teeth on the anterior tibia and the presence of feathery white setae in addition to the dark, erect setae on the pronotum. The shape of the aedeagus is also different.
