= Liparetrus mimicus =

Scientific classification
- Kingdom: Animalia
- Phylum: Arthropoda
- Clade: Pancrustacea
- Class: Insecta
- Order: Coleoptera
- Suborder: Polyphaga
- Infraorder: Scarabaeiformia
- Family: Scarabaeidae
- Genus: Liparetrus
- Species: L. mimicus

Binomial name
- Liparetrus mimicus Lea, 1917

Species of beetle

Liparetrus mimicus is a species of beetle of the family Scarabaeidae. It is found in Australia (South Australia).

== Taxonomy ==
This species belongs to the ferrugineus species group.

== Description ==
Adults reach a length of about 6 mm (0.24 in). They are very similar to Liparetrus gracilipes, but may be distinguished by the 8-segmented antennae.
