= Podotenus tricolor =

Scientific classification
- Kingdom: Animalia
- Phylum: Arthropoda
- Clade: Pancrustacea
- Class: Insecta
- Order: Coleoptera
- Suborder: Polyphaga
- Infraorder: Scarabaeiformia
- Family: Scarabaeidae
- Genus: Podotenus
- Species: P. tricolor

Binomial name
- Podotenus tricolor (Lea, 1923)

Synonyms
- Aphodius tricolor Lea, 1923

Species of beetle

Podotenus tricolor is a species of beetle of the family Scarabaeidae. It is found in Australia (New South Wales).

== Description ==
Adults reach a length of about 5–5.1 mm (0.20–0.20 in). They have an oblong-oval, shining body, which is black anteriorly and has pale setae. The elytra are red with the sides and apex darker. The legs are yellowish and the ventral surface is reddish.
