= Ataenius spinipennis =

Scientific classification
- Kingdom: Animalia
- Phylum: Arthropoda
- Clade: Pancrustacea
- Class: Insecta
- Order: Coleoptera
- Suborder: Polyphaga
- Infraorder: Scarabaeiformia
- Family: Scarabaeidae
- Genus: Ataenius
- Species: A. spinipennis

Binomial name
- Ataenius spinipennis Lea, 1923

Species of beetle

Ataenius spinipennis is a species of beetle of the family Scarabaeidae. It is found in Australia (Queensland, Northern Territory, Western Australia).

== Description ==
Adults reach a length of about 3–4 mm (0.12–0.16 in). They have an oblong-oval, alutaceous, slightly shining, glabrous, reddish-brown to black body, with the margin of the clypeus and legs reddish-brown. The elytral striae are often covered by an argillaceous coating.
