= Proctophanes heterodoxus =

Scientific classification
- Kingdom: Animalia
- Phylum: Arthropoda
- Clade: Pancrustacea
- Class: Insecta
- Order: Coleoptera
- Suborder: Polyphaga
- Infraorder: Scarabaeiformia
- Family: Scarabaeidae
- Genus: Proctophanes
- Species: P. heterodoxus

Binomial name
- Proctophanes heterodoxus (Lea, 1923)

Synonyms
- Aphodius heterodoxus Lea, 1923

Species of beetle

Proctophanes heterodoxus is a species of beetle of the family Scarabaeidae. It is found in Australia (South Australia).

== Description ==
Adults reach a length of about 4.5–5 mm (0.18–0.20 in). They have a shining, castaneous body, with the elytra and legs lighter than the head and pronotum.
