= Liparetrus semicastaneus =

Scientific classification
- Kingdom: Animalia
- Phylum: Arthropoda
- Clade: Pancrustacea
- Class: Insecta
- Order: Coleoptera
- Suborder: Polyphaga
- Infraorder: Scarabaeiformia
- Family: Scarabaeidae
- Genus: Liparetrus
- Species: L. semicastaneus

Binomial name
- Liparetrus semicastaneus Lea, 1917

Synonyms
- Liparetrus apicalis Lea, 1917

Species of beetle

Liparetrus semicastaneus is a species of beetle of the family Scarabaeidae. It is found in Australia (Western Australia).

== Taxonomy ==
This species belongs to the rufipennis species group. The defining characters of this group include the absence of setae and scales on the disc of the pronotum.

== Description ==
Adults reach a length of about 10–11 mm (0.39–0.43 in). The head, pronotum and ventral thorax are black, while the elytra are reddish brown. The abdomen is dark brown in males, but bright reddish yellow in females.
