= Palimbolus femoralis =

Scientific classification
- Domain: Eukaryota
- Kingdom: Animalia
- Phylum: Arthropoda
- Class: Insecta
- Order: Coleoptera
- Suborder: Polyphaga
- Infraorder: Staphyliniformia
- Family: Staphylinidae
- Genus: Palimbolus
- Species: P. femoralis

Binomial name
- Palimbolus femoralis Lea, 1911

Species of beetle

Palimbolus femoralis is a beetle in the Staphylinidae (rove beetle) family, which is found in Australia.

It was first described by Arthur Mills Lea in 1911 from a male specimen collected somewhere in Australia.

== Description ==
Lea describes the species:

Male: Pale castaneous. Rather densely pubescent. Head with a large shallow fovea close to each eye, with an impression from base to apex, deep at apex, fairly distinct at base, but scarcely traceable on middle. Antennae not very stout first joint slightly curved, slightly longer than second and third combined, fourth to eighth of about even size and each feebly transverse, ninth larger and moderately transverse, tenth slightly larger than ninth, eleventh ovate, as long as ninth and tenth combined. Prothorax and elytra much as in the preceding species. Metasternum with a large semicircular fovea behind each median coxa, each fovea about two-thirds the length of the metasternum itself. Undersurface of abdomen with a wide shallow depression common to .several segments. Four hind trochanters strongly dentate; front femora somewhat curved and each with a strong obtuse tooth, which is provided at apex with a thin elongate fascicle; hind tibiae with a strong acute spur at about one-fourth from apex. Length 2¾ mm.

Hab. — Australia (T. Blackburn).

A single male, without locality, given to me years ago by the Rev. T. Blackburn as Tyrus mirandus Sharp; but evidently not that species, although with similar hind tibiae. The front femora, however, are very remarkable, and as a species before me (see below) agrees perfectly with Sharp's description of T. mirandus, I prefer to regard that one as correctly identified. From that species it differs (besides in the front femora) in the metasternum having the basal foveae considerably larger, the four hind trochanters more acutely armed, and the apex of abdomen somewhat different. The curvature of the basal joint of antennae is not visible from above. Although the type appears to be immature, it has been described, as the remarkable front femora readily distinguish it from all previously described species.

== See also ==
Palimbolus elegans
