= Liparetrus semiflavus =

Scientific classification
- Kingdom: Animalia
- Phylum: Arthropoda
- Clade: Pancrustacea
- Class: Insecta
- Order: Coleoptera
- Suborder: Polyphaga
- Infraorder: Scarabaeiformia
- Family: Scarabaeidae
- Genus: Liparetrus
- Species: L. semiflavus

Binomial name
- Liparetrus semiflavus Lea, 1917

Species of beetle

Liparetrus semiflavus is a species of beetle of the family Scarabaeidae. It is found in Australia (Western Australia).

== Taxonomy ==
This species belongs to the lanaticollis species group. The defining characters of this group include the absence of setae on the disc of the elytra, Furthermore, the base and apex of the elytra are usually darker than the disc.

== Description ==
Adults reach a length of about 7–8 mm (0.28–0.31 in). The clypeus is reddish yellow and black at the base, or sometimes completely black. The frons is black and the pronotum is reddish yellow with dark brown to black anterior margins. The scutellum is black with reddish edges and the elytra are pale yellowish brown with dark brown areas. The abdomen is pale yellowish brown.
