= Liparetrus mixtus =

Scientific classification
- Kingdom: Animalia
- Phylum: Arthropoda
- Clade: Pancrustacea
- Class: Insecta
- Order: Coleoptera
- Suborder: Polyphaga
- Infraorder: Scarabaeiformia
- Family: Scarabaeidae
- Genus: Liparetrus
- Species: L. mixtus

Binomial name
- Liparetrus mixtus Lea, 1919

Species of beetle

Liparetrus mixtus is a species of beetle of the family Scarabaeidae. It is found in Australia (New South Wales).

== Taxonomy ==
This species belongs to the atratus species group. The defining characters of this group include the absence of scales on the clypeus, frons, pronotum and abdomen.

== Description ==
Adults reach a length of about 6 mm (0.24 in). The head and pronotum are shining black and iridescent, while the elytra are reddish brown and dull, with the basal area black. The abdomen is also black.
