= Liparetrus semiatriceps =

Scientific classification
- Kingdom: Animalia
- Phylum: Arthropoda
- Clade: Pancrustacea
- Class: Insecta
- Order: Coleoptera
- Suborder: Polyphaga
- Infraorder: Scarabaeiformia
- Family: Scarabaeidae
- Genus: Liparetrus
- Species: L. semiatriceps

Binomial name
- Liparetrus semiatriceps Lea, 1917

Species of beetle

Liparetrus semiatriceps is a species of beetle of the family Scarabaeidae. It is found in Australia (Western Australia, Queensland, Northern Territory).

== Taxonomy ==
This species belongs to the rufipennis species group. The defining characters of this group include the absence of setae and scales on the disc of the pronotum.

== Description ==
Adults reach a length of about 7.5–9 mm (0.30–0.35 in). The clypeus is pale yellowish brown with dark brown margins and the frons is black. The pronotum is pale yellowish brown with the anterior and posterior margins dark brown. The rest of the body is pale yellowish brown, although the legs are not pale.
