= Liparetrus longidens =

Scientific classification
- Kingdom: Animalia
- Phylum: Arthropoda
- Clade: Pancrustacea
- Class: Insecta
- Order: Coleoptera
- Suborder: Polyphaga
- Infraorder: Scarabaeiformia
- Family: Scarabaeidae
- Genus: Liparetrus
- Species: L. longidens

Binomial name
- Liparetrus longidens Lea, 1917

Species of beetle

Liparetrus longidens is a species of beetle of the family Scarabaeidae. It is found in Australia (South Australia).

== Taxonomy ==
This species belongs to the laetus species group.

== Description ==
Adults reach a length of about 4.5 mm (0.18 in). The head and pronotum are black and dull, while the elytra and abdomen are pale yellowish brown.
