= Liparetrus flavus =

Scientific classification
- Kingdom: Animalia
- Phylum: Arthropoda
- Clade: Pancrustacea
- Class: Insecta
- Order: Coleoptera
- Suborder: Polyphaga
- Infraorder: Scarabaeiformia
- Family: Scarabaeidae
- Genus: Liparetrus
- Species: L. flavus

Binomial name
- Liparetrus flavus Lea, 1917

Species of beetle

Liparetrus flavus is a species of beetle of the family Scarabaeidae. It is found in Australia (New South Wales, Victoria, South Australia).

== Taxonomy ==
This species belongs to the flavus species group. The defining characters of this group include the absence of obvious setae on the disc of the pronotum, the glabrous or setate (but without scales) propygidium and pygidium, the elongate elytra and the pale yellowish brown colour of the body.

== Description ==
Adults reach a length of about 6–7.5 mm (0.24–0.30 in). The pronotum has two fringes of yellow setae, while the elytra has some short yellow setae near the lateral margins.
