= Heteronyx pilosus =

Scientific classification
- Kingdom: Animalia
- Phylum: Arthropoda
- Clade: Pancrustacea
- Class: Insecta
- Order: Coleoptera
- Suborder: Polyphaga
- Infraorder: Scarabaeiformia
- Family: Scarabaeidae
- Genus: Heteronyx
- Species: H. pilosus

Binomial name
- Heteronyx pilosus Blanchard, 1850

Species of beetle

Heteronyx pilosus is a species of beetle of the family Scarabaeidae. It is found in Australia (Northern Territory).

== Description ==
Adults reach a length of about 6–7 mm (0.24–0.28 in). They are similar to Heteronyx irrasus, but larger and darker in colour. The pygidium is dull.
