= Helluarchus whitei =

Scientific classification
- Kingdom: Animalia
- Phylum: Arthropoda
- Clade: Pancrustacea
- Class: Insecta
- Order: Coleoptera
- Suborder: Adephaga
- Family: Carabidae
- Genus: Helluarchus
- Species: H. whitei

Binomial name
- Helluarchus whitei Lea, 1914

Species of beetle

Helluarchus whitei is a species of beetle of the family Carabidae. It is found in Australia (South Australia).

== Description ==
Adults reach a length of about 36 mm (1.4 in). The head has scattered distinct punctures, with a wide wrinkled fovea on each side in front. The clypeus has irregular wrinkles and punctures. The antennae pass the scutellum for a slight distance, with the third joint longer than the second or fourth. The pronotum is not quite as long down the middle as the greatest width, with front angles rounded and slightly produced, the sides obliquely upcurved and widest slightly in advance of the middle, and with the hind angles slightly acute and somewhat rounded off, with a narrowly impressed median line, terminating near the apex and near the base in fairly large foveae. There are conspicuous scattered punctures, denser about the sides and base than elsewhere. The elytra are elliptic-ovate, with the surface finely shagreened, with rows of rather small punctures in narrow striae. The interstices are much wider than the striae, the fifth on each elytron conspicuously elevated and marking off the rapidly sloping (almost vertical) sides from the slightly concave median portion, on the posterior declivity bifurcated and not conspicuously elevated. Each interstice has an irregular row (or with parts of two irregular rows) of small punctures, but larger on the sides than elsewhere.
