= Barretthydrus geminatus =

Scientific classification
- Kingdom: Animalia
- Phylum: Arthropoda
- Class: Insecta
- Order: Coleoptera
- Suborder: Adephaga
- Family: Dytiscidae
- Genus: Barretthydrus
- Species: B. geminatus

Binomial name
- Barretthydrus geminatus Lea, 1927

Species of diving beetle

Barretthydrus geminatus is a species of diving beetle in the family, Dytiscidae, first described in 1927 by Arthur Mills Lea. It is native to New South Wales and Queensland.
