= Palimbolus elegans =

Scientific classification
- Domain: Eukaryota
- Kingdom: Animalia
- Phylum: Arthropoda
- Class: Insecta
- Order: Coleoptera
- Suborder: Polyphaga
- Infraorder: Staphyliniformia
- Family: Staphylinidae
- Genus: Palimbolus
- Species: P. elegans

Binomial name
- Palimbolus elegans Lea, 1911

Species of beetle

Palimbolus elegans is a beetle in the Staphylinidae (rove beetle) family, which is found in Tasmania.

It was first described by Arthur Mills Lea in 1911 from male and female specimens collected on Mount Wellington and other places in Tasmania

== Description ==
Lea describes the species:

Male: Reddish-castaneous, legs, palpi, elytra, and upper surface of abdomen somewhat paler; elytra somewhat infuscated on sides near base and apex, and on suture at apex; upper surface of abdomen feebly infuscated in places. With rather dense but somewhat unevenly distributed and more or less golden pubescence. Head rather narrower than usual, strongly convex, with a deep impression in front. Antennae, for the genus, rather thin, first joint as long as second and third combined, fifth slightly longer than fourth or sixth, eighth not transverse, ninth and tenth rather large and feebly transverse, eleventh ovate, scarcely as long as ninth and tenth combined. Prothorax much longer than wide, strongly convex, with a rather large but shallow medio-basal impression, each side with a continuous impression, but somewhat irregular about middle. Elytra at base much wider than widest part of prothorax, sides increasing in width to near apex, with fairly distinct but irregularly distributed punctures, and with several basal impressions. Abdomen with stronger margins than usual, those of the third segment strongly incurved; undersurface with a strong transverse fovea on fourth segment. Pygidium entirely ventral, with a distinct median fovea. Metasternum strongly convex. Hind trochanters strongly and acutely dentate; hind tibiae with a short acute spur at apical third. Length 2½-2¾ mm.

Female: Differs in having head and metasternum less convex, abdo men non-foveate and with normal margins, and legs unarmed.
Hab. — Tasmania : Mount Wellington, in moss; Ulverstone, Frankford, Waratah (A. M. Lea).

The strongly convex head and metasternum, with the narrow prothorax of this beautiful species, are sufficient to distinguish the females from those of all other species known to me. The strong fovea on the fourth ventral segment of the male is very distinctive. The hind tibiae are spurred somewhat as in P. mirandus and P. femoralis, but the spur is more distant from the apex, although less distant than in the figure of P. puncticollis. The infuscation of parts of the elytra and abdomen is not very deep, but is readily seen.

== See also ==
Palimbolus femoralis
