= Liparetrus lividipennis =

Scientific classification
- Kingdom: Animalia
- Phylum: Arthropoda
- Clade: Pancrustacea
- Class: Insecta
- Order: Coleoptera
- Suborder: Polyphaga
- Infraorder: Scarabaeiformia
- Family: Scarabaeidae
- Genus: Liparetrus
- Species: L. lividipennis

Binomial name
- Liparetrus lividipennis Blackburn, 1905

Species of beetle

Liparetrus lividipennis is a species of beetle of the family Scarabaeidae. It is found in Australia (South Australia).

== Taxonomy ==
This species belongs to the striatus species group. The defining characters of this group include the absence of setae on the disc of the pronotum and scales or flattened, adpressed setae on the propygidium and usually also the pygidium.

== Description ==
Adults reach a length of about 7.5 mm (0.30 in). They are similar to Liparetrus striatus, but may be distinguished by the shape of the clypeus in males, by the tiny pale setae on the frons, the densely punctured pygidium and the absence of setae on the disc and anterior margin of the pronotum.
