= Kyogle sexfoveatus =

Scientific classification
- Domain: Eukaryota
- Kingdom: Animalia
- Phylum: Arthropoda
- Class: Insecta
- Order: Coleoptera
- Suborder: Polyphaga
- Infraorder: Staphyliniformia
- Family: Staphylinidae
- Genus: Kyogle
- Species: K. sexfoveatus

Binomial name
- Kyogle sexfoveatus (Arthur Mills Lea, 1911)

Synonyms
- Macroplectus sexfoveatus Lea, 1911

Insect species

Kyogle sexfoveatus is a beetle in the Staphylinidae family, native to Tasmania.

It was first described by Arthur Mills Lea in 1911 as Macroplectus sexfoveatus, from a male specimen collected in Tasmania.

== Description ==
Lea described Macroplectus sexfoveatus as:

Reddish-castaneous, abdomen slightly darker, appendages slightly paler. With rather dense, fine, pale pubescence. Head more convex than usual, but vaguely depressed along middle; each side of middle towards base v/ith a distinct fovea, closed behind but widely and shallowly open in front, the two not connected between antennae, owing to the antennary tubercles being rather longer than usual. Eyes very small. Antennae with first joint from some directions appearing not much longer-than second, but really almost twice as long, second slightly dilated to apex and distinctly longer than third, third slightly longer than fourth, fourth to eighth very small, ninth slightly larger, the tenth slightly larger still, eleventh subovate, but rather strongly pointed, and about as long as eighth to tenth combined. Prothorax slightly transverse, distinctly wider than head, and, excluding the neck, slightly longer; sides dilated near apex; with a deep and almost straight impression close to base, and feebly dilated on each side; median line very feebly impressed; a moderately distinct longitudinal impression on each side, becoming deep near basal impression; with numerous very small punctures. Elytra convex, almost as long as wide, sides some-what inflated in middle, apex almost straight; subsutural stria fairly deep, its base commencing in a small fovea; dorsal stria fine and traceable almost to middle, a small fovea at its base, and another between it and the shoulder; punctures indistinct. Upper surface of abdomen with third segment a trifle longer than second or fourth; lower surface feebly flattened in middle, second, third, and fourth segments of about equal length in middle, the fifth very short. Hind trochanters obtusely dentate. Length 1⅔ mm.

Hab. — Tasmania : Mount Wellington; in moss(A. M. Lea).

When viewed from the sides, the head appears to be feebly tuberculate immediately above the subbasal foveae. The ninth and tenth joints, although larger than the eighth, are still very small, so that the club appears to consist of one joint only, and that not a very large one. The subbasal impressions of the prothorax are very different from those of the two preceding species. The only specimen before me appears to be a male, as its hind trochanters are armed, but the metasternum is rather strongly convex. The tip of the second ventral segment is minutely emarginate on each side of the middle, in consequence of which the middle itself appears to be slightly produced; but this appearance is very indistinct from most directions.
