= Kyogle (disambiguation) =

Kyogle may refer to:

- Kyogle, town in New South Wales
- Kyogle (beetle), insect genus
- Kyogle Council, government area in Northern Rivers
- Kyogle railway station, in North Coast line
- Kyogle Turkeys, Rugby league club in Australia
