= Liparetrus compositus =

Scientific classification
- Kingdom: Animalia
- Phylum: Arthropoda
- Clade: Pancrustacea
- Class: Insecta
- Order: Coleoptera
- Suborder: Polyphaga
- Infraorder: Scarabaeiformia
- Family: Scarabaeidae
- Genus: Liparetrus
- Species: L. compositus

Binomial name
- Liparetrus compositus Lea, 1917

Species of beetle

Liparetrus compositus is a species of beetle of the family Scarabaeidae. It is found in Australia (Western Australia).

== Taxonomy ==
This species belongs to the rufipennis species group. The defining characters of this group include the absence of setae and scales on the disc of the pronotum.

== Description ==
Adults reach a length of about 10.5–12 mm (0.41–0.47 in). The head is black and the pronotum, elytra and abdomen are reddish brown to black. The ventral thorax is black. The elytra have pale yellowish apical margins.
