= Liparetrus unidentatus =

Scientific classification
- Kingdom: Animalia
- Phylum: Arthropoda
- Clade: Pancrustacea
- Class: Insecta
- Order: Coleoptera
- Suborder: Polyphaga
- Infraorder: Scarabaeiformia
- Family: Scarabaeidae
- Genus: Liparetrus
- Species: L. unidentatus

Binomial name
- Liparetrus unidentatus Lea, 1917

Species of beetle

Liparetrus unidentatus is a species of beetle of the family Scarabaeidae. It is found in Australia (Queensland).

== Taxonomy ==
This species belongs to the monticola species group.

== Description ==
Adults reach a length of about 5.5 mm (0.22 in). The frons is dark brown, while the remainder of the body is brown. The upper surface is without setae.
