= Kyogle conicicornis =

Scientific classification
- Domain: Eukaryota
- Kingdom: Animalia
- Phylum: Arthropoda
- Class: Insecta
- Order: Coleoptera
- Suborder: Polyphaga
- Infraorder: Staphyliniformia
- Family: Staphylinidae
- Genus: Kyogle
- Species: K. conicicornis

Binomial name
- Kyogle conicicornis (Arthur Mills Lea, 1911)

Synonyms
- Euplectops conicicornis Lea, 1911

Insect species

Kyogle conicicornis is a weevil in the Staphylinidae family, native to Tasmania.

It was first described by Arthur Mills Lea in 1911 as Euplectops conicicornis, from specimen(s) collected in Tasmania.
