= Proctophanes metasternalis =

Scientific classification
- Kingdom: Animalia
- Phylum: Arthropoda
- Clade: Pancrustacea
- Class: Insecta
- Order: Coleoptera
- Suborder: Polyphaga
- Infraorder: Scarabaeiformia
- Family: Scarabaeidae
- Genus: Proctophanes
- Species: P. metasternalis

Binomial name
- Proctophanes metasternalis (Lea, 1923)

Synonyms
- Proctammodes metasternalis Lea, 1923

Species of beetle

Proctophanes metasternalis is a species of beetle of the family Scarabaeidae. It is found in Australia (New South Wales).

== Description ==
Adults reach a length of about 3.5–3.8 mm (0.14–0.15 in). They have a robust, ovoid, slightly shining body. The colour varies from black to light castaneous. Some specimens have reddish or brownish areas on the head and pronotum and others have testaceous elytra with darker markings at the sides.

== Life history ==
Specimens have been collected in wallaby dung.
