= Liparetrus lissapterus =

Scientific classification
- Kingdom: Animalia
- Phylum: Arthropoda
- Clade: Pancrustacea
- Class: Insecta
- Order: Coleoptera
- Suborder: Polyphaga
- Infraorder: Scarabaeiformia
- Family: Scarabaeidae
- Genus: Liparetrus
- Species: L. lissapterus

Binomial name
- Liparetrus lissapterus Lea, 1917

Species of beetle

Liparetrus lissapterus is a species of beetle of the family Scarabaeidae. It is found in Australia (South Australia, Victoria).

== Taxonomy ==
This species belongs to the luridipennis species group. The defining characters of this group include setae on the disc of the pronotum.

== Description ==
Adults reach a length of about 8 mm (0.31 in). The head, pronotum and abdomen are black, while the elytra, antennae and legs are reddish brown.
