= Liparetrus niger =

Scientific classification
- Kingdom: Animalia
- Phylum: Arthropoda
- Clade: Pancrustacea
- Class: Insecta
- Order: Coleoptera
- Suborder: Polyphaga
- Infraorder: Scarabaeiformia
- Family: Scarabaeidae
- Genus: Liparetrus
- Species: L. niger

Binomial name
- Liparetrus niger Lea, 1917

Species of beetle

Liparetrus niger is a species of beetle of the family Scarabaeidae. It is found in Australia (Western Australia, South Australia).

== Taxonomy ==
This species belongs to the fulvohirtus species group. The defining characters of this group include the presence of setae on the discs of the pronotum and elytra.

== Description ==
Adults reach a length of about 10 mm (0.39 in). The head, pronotum, elytra, abdomen and ventral surface are black, while the antennae are yellowish brown. The front legs are mostly yellowish brown, while the remaining legs are dark brown.
