= Liparetrus iridipennis =

Scientific classification
- Kingdom: Animalia
- Phylum: Arthropoda
- Clade: Pancrustacea
- Class: Insecta
- Order: Coleoptera
- Suborder: Polyphaga
- Infraorder: Scarabaeiformia
- Family: Scarabaeidae
- Genus: Liparetrus
- Species: L. iridipennis

Binomial name
- Liparetrus iridipennis Germar, 1848

Synonyms
- Liparetrus carus Lea, 1917; Liparetrus senex Blackburn, 1888; Liparetrus holosericeus MacLeay, 1886; Liparetrus sylvicola Blanchard, 1853; Liparetrus obscurus Blanchard, 1846

Species of beetle

Liparetrus iridipennis is a species of beetle of the family Scarabaeidae. It is found in Australia (Victoria, New South Wales, South Australia, Tasmania).

== Taxonomy ==
This species belongs to the gracilipes species group. The defining characters of this group include the absence of setae on the discs of the pronotum and elytra, while the pronotum is either without setae on the anterior margin or with only a few setae on each side.

== Description ==
Adults reach a length of about 7.5–9 mm (0.30–0.35 in). They are similar to Liparetrus gracilipes, but may be distinguished by the shape of the clypeus in males, the more faintly punctured pronotum and the shape of the aedeagus.
