= Ataenius insularis =

Scientific classification
- Kingdom: Animalia
- Phylum: Arthropoda
- Clade: Pancrustacea
- Class: Insecta
- Order: Coleoptera
- Suborder: Polyphaga
- Infraorder: Scarabaeiformia
- Family: Scarabaeidae
- Genus: Ataenius
- Species: A. insularis

Binomial name
- Ataenius insularis Lea, 1923

Synonyms
- Ataenius molestus Petrovitz, 1964

Species of beetle

Ataenius insularis is a species of beetle of the family Scarabaeidae. It is found in Australia (Northern Territory, Queensland).

== Description ==
Adults reach a length of about 3.8–4.5 mm (0.15–0.18 in). They have an elongate, glabrous, shining or slightly alutaceous, black body, with the anterior of the clypeus and legs reddish.
