= Liparetrus simulator =

Scientific classification
- Kingdom: Animalia
- Phylum: Arthropoda
- Clade: Pancrustacea
- Class: Insecta
- Order: Coleoptera
- Suborder: Polyphaga
- Infraorder: Scarabaeiformia
- Family: Scarabaeidae
- Genus: Liparetrus
- Species: L. simulator

Binomial name
- Liparetrus simulator Lea, 1926

Species of beetle

Liparetrus simulator is a species of beetle of the family Scarabaeidae. It is found in Australia (Northern Territory).

== Taxonomy ==
This species belongs to the lanaticollis species group. The defining characters of this group include the absence of setae on the disc of the elytra, Furthermore, the base and apex of the elytra are usually darker than the disc.

== Description ==
Adults reach a length of about 7 mm (0.28 in). The head is shining black, while the pronotum is dull and black. The elytra are pale yellowish brown on the disc with dark brown margins. The abdomen, ventral surface and legs are reddish brown.
