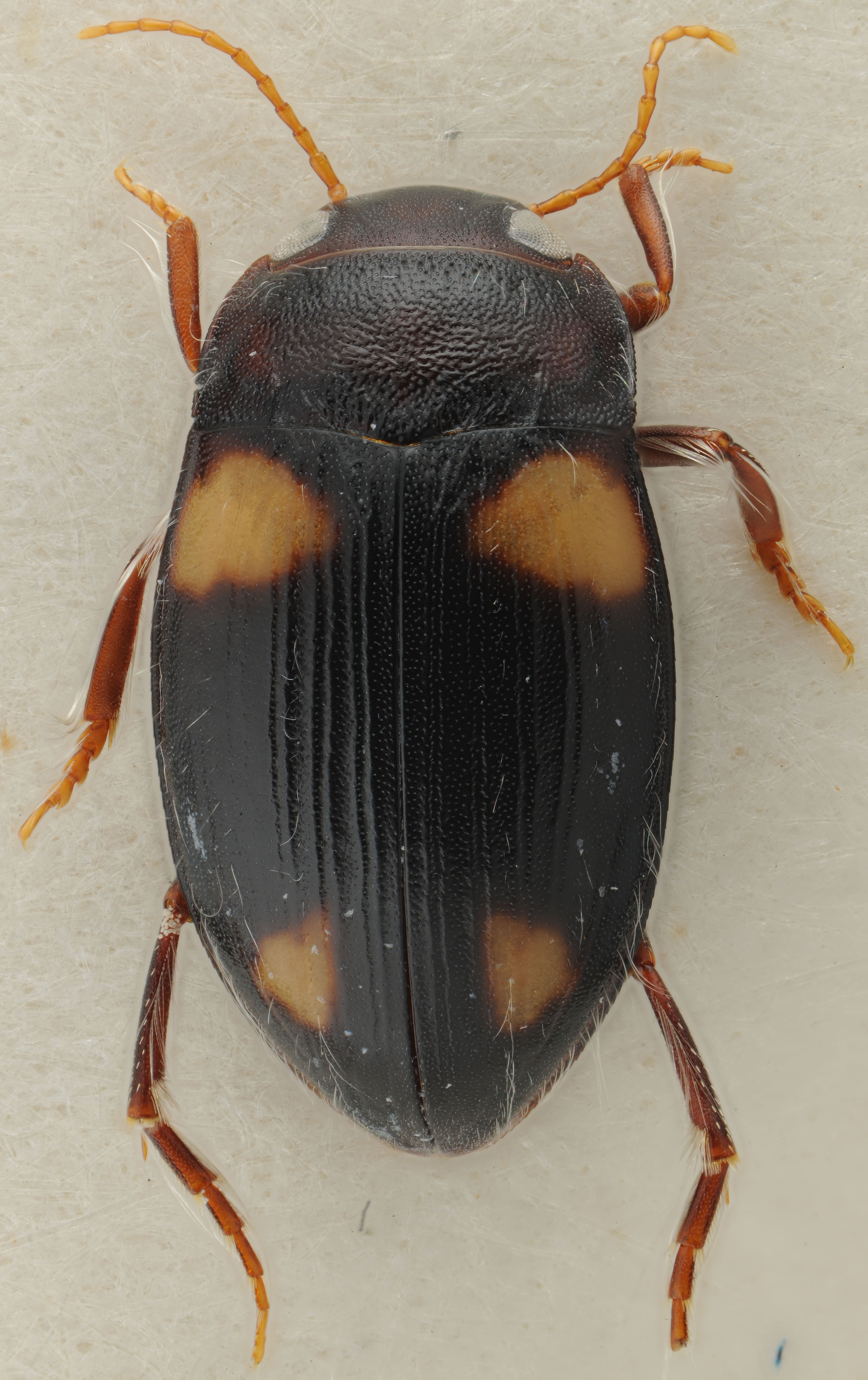

Scientific classification
- Kingdom: Animalia
- Phylum: Arthropoda
- Class: Insecta
- Order: Coleoptera
- Suborder: Adephaga
- Family: Dytiscidae
- Genus: Barretthydrus
- Species: B. tibialis

Binomial name
- Barretthydrus tibialis Lea, 1927
- Holotype site: Allyn River'"`UNIQ--ref-00000002-QINU`"'

= Barretthydrus tibialis =

Species of diving beetle

Barretthydrus tibialis is a species of freshwater diving beetle in the family, Dytiscidae, first described in 1927 by Arthur Mills Lea.

The species is endemic to Australia and found in drainage basins along the east coast from Queensland to Victoria.
