= Ataenius microtrichopterus =

Scientific classification
- Kingdom: Animalia
- Phylum: Arthropoda
- Clade: Pancrustacea
- Class: Insecta
- Order: Coleoptera
- Suborder: Polyphaga
- Infraorder: Scarabaeiformia
- Family: Scarabaeidae
- Genus: Ataenius
- Species: A. microtrichopterus

Binomial name
- Ataenius microtrichopterus Lea, 1923

Synonyms
- Ataenius vulpes Petrovitz, 1961

Species of beetle

Ataenius microtrichopterus is a species of beetle of the family Scarabaeidae. It is found in Australia (Northern Territory, Queensland, Western Australia, South Australia).

== Description ==
Adults reach a length of about 3.7–4.5 mm (0.15–0.18 in). They have an elongate, nearly parallel-sided, moderately convex, shining, castaneous to black body, with the anterior of the clypeus reddish.
