= Liparetrus trichopygus =

Scientific classification
- Kingdom: Animalia
- Phylum: Arthropoda
- Clade: Pancrustacea
- Class: Insecta
- Order: Coleoptera
- Suborder: Polyphaga
- Infraorder: Scarabaeiformia
- Family: Scarabaeidae
- Genus: Liparetrus
- Species: L. trichopygus

Binomial name
- Liparetrus trichopygus Lea, 1917

Species of beetle

Liparetrus trichopygus is a species of beetle of the family Scarabaeidae. It is found in Australia (Western Australia).

== Taxonomy ==
This species belongs to the discipennis species group. The defining characters of this group include the presence of long setae on the disc of the elytra (at least towards the base).

== Description ==
Adults reach a length of about 8–11 mm (0.31–0.43 in). The body is black, with iridescent elytra. The antennae are brown with a black club. The legs are black except for the dark reddish tarsi.
