= Tinaroo gibbicollis =

Scientific classification
- Domain: Eukaryota
- Kingdom: Animalia
- Phylum: Arthropoda
- Class: Insecta
- Order: Coleoptera
- Suborder: Polyphaga
- Infraorder: Staphyliniformia
- Family: Staphylinidae
- Genus: Tinaroo
- Species: T. gibbicollis

Binomial name
- Tinaroo gibbicollis (Lea, 1911)

Synonyms
- Batrisodes gibbicollis Lea, 1911

Species of beetle

Tinaroo gibbicollis is a beetle in the Staphylinidae family, which is found in Victoria.

It was first described by Arthur Mills Lea in 1911 as Batrisodes gibbicollis from a male specimen collected in Victoria, (in Wandin).

== Description ==
Lea describes the species:

Male: reddish-castaneous, appendages very little paler. With rather long pale pubescence; with sparse and paler long hairs scattered about. Head with antennary tubercles somewhat rounded and prominent, a narrow impression between them; forehead with a narrow longitudinal impression; with a distinct but rather small fovea close to each eye, closed behind but narrowly open in front. Antennae long and thin. Prothorax lightly transverse, sides strongly dilated and with distinct punctures near apex; with a deep, rounded fovea, close to base, and shallowly connected with an irregular impression on each side of base, the irregular impression continued round sides to apex; disc strongly elevated, the elevated portion gradually narrowed to apex, which is truncated or very gently arcuate and overhangs a frontal excavation. Elytra with dorsal striae fairly deep, but terminated before middle; shoulders somewhat raised but unarmed; with fine scattered punctiiies. Metasternum rather shallowly impressed along middle, with a granule between hind coxae. Trochanters unarmed. Length 2¼-2½ mm.

Hab. — Victoria (National Museum, ex E. Jarvis).

Seen from the side the prothorax appears to be largely excavated in front, with a tubercle overhanging the excavation; a character which will readily distinguish the species from all previously described ones. The antennae are much as in the preceding species, except that the fifth and seventh joints are slightly longer, and the ninth and tenth slightly shorter.
