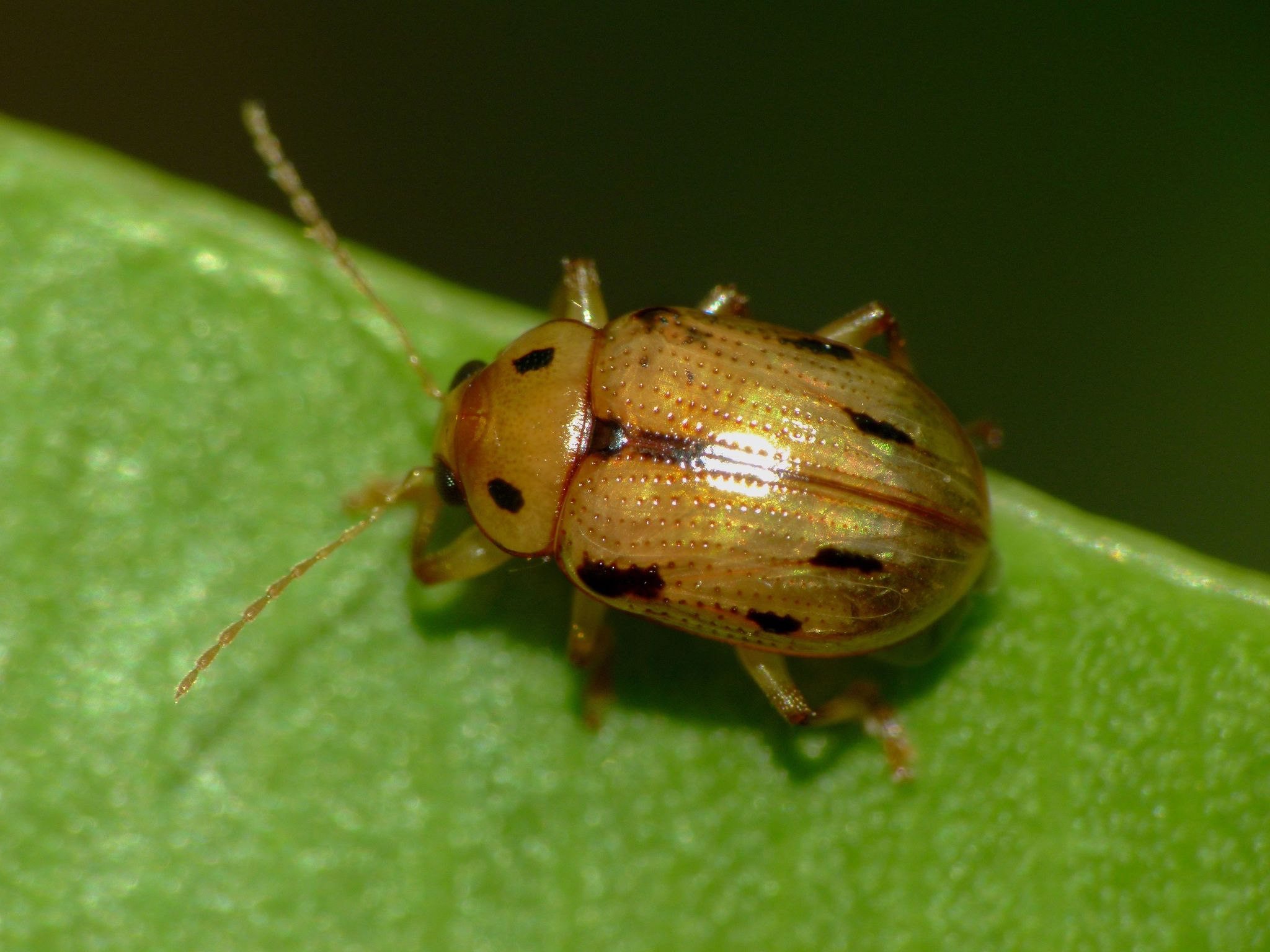
- Rhyparida brevilineata

Scientific classification
- Kingdom: Animalia
- Phylum: Arthropoda
- Clade: Pancrustacea
- Class: Insecta
- Order: Coleoptera
- Suborder: Polyphaga
- Infraorder: Cucujiformia
- Family: Chrysomelidae
- Subfamily: Eumolpinae
- Tribe: Typophorini
- Genus: Rhyparida; Baly, 1861

Type species
- Rhyparida dimidiata Baly, 1861

Synonyms
- Marsaeus Clark, 1864

= Rhyparida =

Genus of leaf beetles

Rhyparida is a genus of leaf beetles in the subfamily Eumolpinae. It is mainly distributed in the Australasian, Oceanian and Indomalayan realms. It is most species-rich in Australia (about 100 species) and New Guinea (about 90 species), and reaches as far east as Samoa. Two species are also known from the African islands of Madagascar and Seychelles.

== Description ==
In general appearance, beetles of this genus are 3-5 mm long, shiny, and black or brown in colour.

Among Australian Eumolpinae, Rhyparida can be distinguished by the following features: head with groove above or along inner margin of eyes, sides of pronotal disc never swollen, head and pronotum with simple concave setiferous punctures, mid and hind tibiae excavate for about the last third of the outer margin and this excavation is fringed with stiff setae, tarsal claws bifid.

== Species ==
The following species are placed in the genus:

- Rhyparida adonarae Jacoby, 1894 – Adonara
- Rhyparida aemula Weise, 1923 – Australia
- Rhyparida aenea Gressitt, 1967 – Normanby Island
- Rhyparida aeneopurpurea Gressitt, 1967 – Papua New Guinea
- Rhyparida aeneotincta Blackburn, 1889 – Australia
- Rhyparida aethiops Weise, 1922 – Philippines
- Rhyparida alcyone Lea, 1915 – Australia
- Rhyparida alleni Lea, 1915 – Australia
- Rhyparida amabilis Baly, 1867 – New Guinea
- Rhyparida ambigua Weise, 1923 – Australia
- Rhyparida amboinensis Baly, 1867 – Ambon
- Rhyparida amplicollis Blackburn, 1889 – Australia
- Rhyparida angulata Gressitt, 1967 – Papua New Guinea
- Rhyparida angulicollis Baly, 1867 – Seram
- Rhyparida angustata Jacoby, 1894 – New Guinea
- Rhyparida angusticollis Lea, 1915 – Australia
- Rhyparida antiquula Weise, 1922 – Philippines
- Rhyparida apicalis Jacoby, 1884 – Australia
- Rhyparida apicipennis Jacoby, 1898 – Fergusson Island, Trobriand Islands
- Rhyparida archboldensis Gressitt, 1967 – Western New Guinea
- Rhyparida artha Maulik, 1935 – New Guinea
- Rhyparida aruensis Baly, 1867 – Aru
- Rhyparida assamensis Jacoby, 1908 – Northeast India (Patkai)
- Rhyparida assimilis (Lefèvre, 1890) – Borneo
- Rhyparida atra Jacoby, 1894 – New Guinea
- Rhyparida atra Lea, 1915 (junior homonym of above) – Australia
- Rhyparida atrata Macleay, 1884 – New Guinea
- Rhyparida audax Gressitt, 1967 – Papua New Guinea
- Rhyparida aureovirida Gressitt, 1957 – American Samoa
- Rhyparida australis (Boheman, 1858) – Australia
- Rhyparida bakeri Weise, 1922 – Philippines
- Rhyparida balyi Jacoby, 1894 – Tanimbar Islands
- Rhyparida basalis Baly, 1867 – Australia
- Rhyparida basileptana Medvedev, 2009 – Sulawesi
- Rhyparida basileptoides Weise, 1923 – Australia
- Rhyparida basipennis Lea, 1915 – Australia
- Rhyparida bicolor Jacoby, 1884 – Sumatra
- Rhyparida bicostulata Weise, 1922 – Philippines
- Rhyparida biformis Weise, 1922 – Philippines
- Rhyparida bilineata Medvedev, 2010 – North India (Darjeeling)
- Rhyparida bimaculata Jacoby, 1889 – Southwestern China (Yunnan), Nepal, North India, Myanmar, Thailand, North Vietnam
- Rhyparida bimaculicollis Lea, 1915 – Australia
- Rhyparida bimaculipennis Achard, 1914 – Australia
- Rhyparida biplagiata (Baly, 1864) – Bacan Islands
- Rhyparida bivitticollis Lea, 1915 – Australia
- Rhyparida bivittipennis Lea, 1922 – Australia
- Rhyparida bosi Medvedev, 2009 – Sulawesi
- Rhyparida bougainvillea Gressitt, 1967
  - Rhyparida bougainvillea bougainvillea Gressitt, 1967 – Bougainville Island
  - Rhyparida bougainvillea pruinosa Gressitt, 1967 – Guadalcanal
- Rhyparida brandti Gressitt, 1967 – Papua New Guinea
- Rhyparida brassi Gressitt, 1967 – Papua New Guinea
- Rhyparida brevicollis Jacoby, 1898 – Fergusson Island
- Rhyparida brevilineata Jacoby, 1898 – Australia
- Rhyparida brevis Lea, 1915 – Australia
- Rhyparida bryani Gressitt, 1957 – Fiji
- Rhyparida bryanti Gressitt, 1967 – Papua New Guinea
- Rhyparida buechei Medvedev, 2009 – Sulawesi
- Rhyparida bukejsi Medvedev, 2013 – Sumatra
- Rhyparida cacaovora Gressitt, 1967 – Western New Guinea, Papua New Guinea
- Rhyparida caeruleipennis Lea, 1915 – Australia
- Rhyparida calami Gressitt, 1967 – Western New Guinea, Papua New Guinea
- Rhyparida carinipennis Gressitt, 1967 – Papua New Guinea
- Rhyparida carolina Chûjô, 1943
  - Rhyparida carolina carolina Chûjô, 1943 – Micronesia (Kosrae)
  - Rhyparida carolina ponapeana Gressitt, 1955 – Micronesia (Pohnpei)
  - Rhyparida carolina trukana Gressitt, 1955 – Micronesia (Chuuk Lagoon)
- Rhyparida carteri Lea, 1915 – Australia
- Rhyparida castanea Jacoby, 1884 – New Guinea
- Rhyparida celebensis Baly, 1867 – Sulawesi
- Rhyparida ceramensis Medvedev, 2003 – Seram
- Rhyparida clypeata Jacoby, 1884 – Australia
- Rhyparida commutabilis Lea, 1915 – Australia
- Rhyparida compositae Gressitt, 1967 – Western New Guinea
- Rhyparida condaoensis Medvedev, 2010 – Vietnam (Côn Đảo)
- Rhyparida confusa Baly, 1867 – Seram, Halmahera, Bacan Islands, Papua New Guinea
- Rhyparida conicicollis Medvedev, 2010 – India
- Rhyparida copei Lea, 1915 – Australia
- Rhyparida coriacea Jacoby, 1895 – Papua New Guinea
- Rhyparida costata Jacoby, 1898 – Philippines
- Rhyparida crassipes Lea, 1915 – Australia
- Rhyparida cupreata Baly, 1867 – New Guinea
- Rhyparida cyclops Gressitt, 1967 – Western New Guinea, Papua New Guinea
- Rhyparida cyrtops Lea, 1921 – Australia
- Rhyparida decipiens Lea, 1915 – Australia
- Rhyparida dejecta Gressitt, 1967 – Western New Guinea
- Rhyparida dentipes (Chen, 1935) – East China (Zhejiang)
- Rhyparida depressa Jacoby, 1895 – Java
- Rhyparida didyma (Fabricius, 1775) – Australia, Papua New Guinea
- Rhyparida diluta Weise, 1922 – Philippines
- Rhyparida dimidiata Baly, 1861 – Australia
- Rhyparida dimidiatipennis Baly, 1864 – New Guinea
- Rhyparida discopunctulata Blackburn, 1889 – Australia
- Rhyparida dispar Bryant, 1925 – Fiji
- Rhyparida distincta Baly, 1867 – Sulawesi
- Rhyparida diversa Baly, 1867 – Sulawesi
- Rhyparida diversicornis Medvedev, 1995 – Philippines
- Rhyparida dybasi Gressitt, 1955 – Palau
- Rhyparida elevata Baly, 1867 – Waigeo
- Rhyparida elliptica Lea, 1915 – Australia
- Rhyparida esakii Chûjô, 1943 – Palau
- Rhyparida eunigripes Moseyko & Medvedev, 2005 – Fergusson Island
- Rhyparida eupallida Moseyko & Medvedev, 2005 – Australia
- Rhyparida faitsilongi Romantsov & Moseyko, 2016 – North Vietnam
- Rhyparida fallax Weise, 1923 – Australia
- Rhyparida fasciata Baly, 1864 – Australia, Western New Guinea, Papua New Guinea, New Britain, New Ireland
- Rhyparida femorata Baly, 1864 – New Guinea
- Rhyparida fervidus (Lefèvre, 1885) – Philippines
- Rhyparida fijiensis Gressitt, 1957 – Fiji
- Rhyparida flava (Clark, 1864) – Australia
- Rhyparida flavipennis Lea, 1915 – Australia
- Rhyparida flavolatera Lea, 1915 – Australia
- Rhyparida foaensis (Jolivet, Verma & Mille, 2007) – New Caledonia
- Rhyparida formosana Aslam, 1968 – Taiwan
- Rhyparida forticornis Weise, 1923 – Australia
- Rhyparida foveicollis Gressitt, 1967 – Papua New Guinea
- Rhyparida fraternalis Baly, 1867 – New Guinea
- Rhyparida fruhstorferi Jacoby, 1898 – Western New Guinea, Biak, Yapen
- Rhyparida fulvescens Baly, 1867 – Halmahera
- Rhyparida fulviceps Baly, 1864 – Sulawesi
- Rhyparida fulvicornis Jacoby, 1894 – Bacan Islands
- Rhyparida fulvipes Baly, 1867 – Kai Islands
- Rhyparida fulvolimbata Lefèvre, 1885 – Australia
- Rhyparida funera Lea, 1922 – Australia
- Rhyparida fuscosuturalis Lea, 1915 – Australia
- Rhyparida gazella Gressitt, 1967 – New Britain
- Rhyparida gemmula Gressitt, 1967 – Western New Guinea
- Rhyparida geniculata Baly, 1861 – New Guinea
- Rhyparida gilgilensis Gressitt, 1967 – New Ireland
- Rhyparida gloriosa Gressitt, 1967 – Papua New Guinea
- Rhyparida goilalae Gressitt, 1967 – Papua New Guinea
- Rhyparida gorbunovi Medvedev, 2009 – Sulawesi
- Rhyparida gracilipes Gressitt, 1967 – Papua New Guinea
- Rhyparida halticoides Lea, 1915 – Australia
- Rhyparida hardyi Gressitt, 1967 – Western New Guinea
- Rhyparida hebes Weise, 1922 – Philippines
- Rhyparida helvola Weise, 1922 – Philippines
- Rhyparida herbacea Blackburn, 1889 – Australia
- Rhyparida himalayana Medvedev, 2010 – North India (Darjeeling)
- Rhyparida horsfieldii Baly, 1867 – Java
- Rhyparida humeralis Lea, 1915 – Australia
- Rhyparida humeronotata Jacoby, 1905 – New Guinea
- Rhyparida huona Gressitt, 1967 – Papua New Guinea
- Rhyparida hypocrita Weise, 1922 – Philippines
- Rhyparida illaesa Weise, 1922 – Philippines
- Rhyparida impavida Gressitt, 1967 – Papua New Guinea
- Rhyparida impressicollis Baly, 1867 – New Guinea
- Rhyparida impressipennis Bryant, 1949 – New Guinea
- Rhyparida impuncticollis Baly, 1864 – Bacan Islands
- Rhyparida inconspicua Baly, 1867 – Philippines
- Rhyparida inconstans Baly, 1864 – Bacan Islands, Ternate
- Rhyparida indica Medvedev, 2010 – East India
- Rhyparida inguinata Weise, 1916 – Australia
- Rhyparida instabilis Baly, 1867 – New Guinea, Misool
- Rhyparida insulicola Lea, 1915 – Australia
- Rhyparida interioris Blackburn, 1889 – Australia
- Rhyparida intermontana Gressitt, 1967 – Papua New Guinea, Fergusson Island
- Rhyparida iridipennis Jacoby, 1895 – Borneo
- Rhyparida javanensis Baly, 1867 – Java
- Rhyparida juvenis Weise, 1916 – Australia
- Rhyparida kalninsi Medvedev, 2013 – Seram
- Rhyparida kandavu Gressitt, 1957 – Fiji
- Rhyparida karimui Gressitt, 1967 – Papua New Guinea
- Rhyparida katrinae Medvedev, 1995 – Philippines
- Rhyparida khasianensis Jacoby, 1899 – Northeast India (Khasi Hills)
- Rhyparida kotoensis Chûjô, 1956 – Taiwan
- Rhyparida kuskus Gressitt, 1967 – Papua New Guinea
- Rhyparida labiata Baly, 1867 – New Guinea
- Rhyparida laddi Gressitt, 1957 – Fiji
- Rhyparida lankana Medvedev, 2010 – Sri Lanka
- Rhyparida lateralis Baly, 1867 – Philippines
- Rhyparida laterivittata Baly, 1867 – Misool
- Rhyparida leana Gomez-Zurita, 2011 – Australia
- Rhyparida leyteana (Medvedev, 1995) – Philippines
- Rhyparida limbata Baly, 1864 – Sulawesi
- Rhyparida limbatipennis Jacoby, 1895 – Australia
- Rhyparida lineaticollis Weise, 1923 – Australia
- Rhyparida lineola Weise, 1913 – New Guinea
- Rhyparida lineolata (Weise, 1913) – Japan, Philippines, Mariana Islands
- Rhyparida lineolata Gressitt, 1967 (junior homonym of above) – Papua New Guinea
- Rhyparida longipes Jacoby, 1894 – New Guinea
- Rhyparida lorquinii Baly, 1867 – Sulawesi
- Rhyparida luteola Fairmaire, 1879 – Fiji
- Rhyparida m-nigrum Weise, 1916 – Australia
- Rhyparida maai Gressitt, 1967 – New Britain
- Rhyparida malandensis Weise, 1923 – Australia
- Rhyparida malayana Medvedev, 2010 – Peninsular Malaysia (Perak)
- Rhyparida margaretae Gressitt, 1967 – Papua New Guinea
- Rhyparida margrafi Medvedev, 1995 – Philippines
- Rhyparida mayae Lea, 1915 – Australia
- Rhyparida medionigra Lea, 1915 – Australia
- Rhyparida mediorufa Lea, 1915 – Australia
- Rhyparida mediovittata Lea, 1915 – Australia
- Rhyparida megalops Lea, 1915 – Australia
- Rhyparida melanocephala Jacoby, 1898 – Papua New Guinea, Fergusson Island, Normanby Island
- Rhyparida melanocholica Jacoby, 1884 – New Guinea
- Rhyparida melas Weise, 1922 – Philippines
- Rhyparida melvillensis Lea, 1915 – Australia
- Rhyparida metallica Jacoby, 1884 – New Guinea
- Rhyparida microdentata Medvedev & Takizawa, 2011 – Bali
- Rhyparida microsticta Lea, 1926 – Australia
- Rhyparida militaris Lea, 1915 – Australia
- Rhyparida minuscula Lea, 1915 – Australia
- Rhyparida minuta Jacoby, 1884 – Australia
- Rhyparida modesta Gahan, 1900 – Christmas Island
- Rhyparida moesta Baly, 1867 – New Guinea
- Rhyparida montivaga Weise, 1923 – Australia
- Rhyparida morosa Jacoby, 1884 – Australia
- Rhyparida nigripennis Baly, 1864 – New Guinea
- Rhyparida nigripes (Lefèvre, 1885) – Philippines
- Rhyparida nigrita Bryant, 1949 – New Guinea
- Rhyparida nigriventris Lea, 1922 – Australia
- Rhyparida nigroaenea Baly, 1864 – Western New Guinea, Papua New Guinea, Biak
- Rhyparida nigrocyanea (Clark, 1864) – Australia
- Rhyparida nigrosignata Jacoby, 1884 – Sumatra
- Rhyparida nigrostriata Bryant, 1949 – New Guinea
- Rhyparida nigroviridis Jacoby, 1884 – Ambon
- Rhyparida nitida Clark, 1864 – Australia
- Rhyparida nodostomoides Jacoby, 1894 – New Guinea
- Rhyparida normalis Gressitt, 1967 – Papua New Guinea
- Rhyparida notata Weise, 1923 – Australia
- Rhyparida novaeguinensis Bryant, 1949 – New Guinea
- Rhyparida nucea Baly, 1867 – Philippines
- Rhyparida obliqua Lea, 1922 – Australia
- Rhyparida obliterata Baly, 1867 – Java
- Rhyparida oblonga Bryant, 1957 – Fiji
- Rhyparida obscuripennis Jacoby, 1905 – Goodenough Island
- Rhyparida obsoleta Baly, 1867 – New Guinea
- Rhyparida ochroleuca Weise, 1923 – Australia
- Rhyparida opacipennis Jacoby, 1884 – New Guinea
- Rhyparida ophthalmica Lea, 1915 – Australia
- Rhyparida ornatipennis Medvedev, 2013 – Sumatra
- Rhyparida ovata Lea, 1915 – Australia
- Rhyparida padma Maulik, 1935 – Aru Islands
- Rhyparida pallidula Lea, 1915 – Australia
- Rhyparida pallidus (Lefèvre, 1890) – Borneo
- Rhyparida pallipes Weise, 1916 – Australia
- Rhyparida palmarum Gressitt, 1967 – Papua New Guinea
- Rhyparida papuana Jacoby, 1905 – New Guinea
- Rhyparida parilis Weise, 1923 – Australia
- Rhyparida parvicollis Lea, 1915 – Australia
- Rhyparida parvula Baly, 1867 – New Guinea
- Rhyparida pascoei Baly, 1864 – Sulawesi
- Rhyparida paupercula Weise, 1923 – Australia
- Rhyparida perang Takizawa, 2017 – Borneo (Sabah)
- Rhyparida perpusilla Weise, 1916 – Australia
- Rhyparida philippina Weise, 1922 – Philippines
- Rhyparida picea Baly, 1867 – New Guinea
- Rhyparida picticollis Gressitt, 1967 – Papua New Guinea
- Rhyparida pictipennis Jacoby, 1894 – New Guinea
- Rhyparida pictipes Weise, 1922 – Philippines
- Rhyparida pilosa Lea, 1915 – Australia
- Rhyparida placida Baly, 1867 – Kai Islands
- Rhyparida platyderes Lea, 1915 – Australia
- Rhyparida plebejus (Lefèvre, 1885) – Philippines
- Rhyparida polymorpha Lea, 1915 – Australia
- Rhyparida prosternalis Jacoby, 1894 – Western New Guinea, Papua New Guinea, Biak
- Rhyparida polychroma Weise, 1922 – Philippines
- Rhyparida posticalis Blackburn, 1889 – Australia
- Rhyparida praecellens Weise, 1922 – Philippines
- Rhyparida procerula Weise, 1922 – Philippines
- Rhyparida proxima Weise, 1923 – Australia
- Rhyparida pruinicollis Gressitt, 1967 – Western New Guinea
- Rhyparida pulchella Baly, 1861 – New Guinea, Misool
- Rhyparida puncticollis Baly, 1867 – Sulawesi
- Rhyparida punctissima Fairmaire, 1879 – Tonga
- Rhyparida punctulata Blackburn, 1889 – Australia
- Rhyparida purana Maulik, 1935 – Sumatra
- Rhyparida purpurea Baly, 1867 – New Guinea
- Rhyparida quatei Gressitt, 1967 – Western New Guinea
- Rhyparida regina Gressitt, 1967 – Papua New Guinea
- Rhyparida regularis Baly, 1864 – New Guinea
- Rhyparida reiterata Gomez-Zurita, 2011 – Australia
- Rhyparida ribbei Jacoby, 1898 – Solomon Islands (Shortland Islands)
- Rhyparida rivularis Jacoby, 1905 – New Guinea
- Rhyparida robusta Bryant, 1949 – New Guinea
- Rhyparida rossi Gahan, 1900 – Christmas Island
- Rhyparida rudipunctata Gressitt, 1967 – Papua New Guinea
- Rhyparida rufa (Clark, 1864) – Australia
- Rhyparida ruficeps Lea, 1915 – Australia
- Rhyparida ruficollis (Clark, 1864) – Australia
- Rhyparida rufoflava (Clark, 1864) – Australia
- Rhyparida rufoparva Lea, 1926 – Australia
- Rhyparida rugicollis Gressitt, 1967 – Papua New Guinea
- Rhyparida rugosa Bryant, 1949 – Papua New Guinea
- Rhyparida rupa Maulik, 1935 – Sulawesi
- Rhyparida sakisimensis Yuasa, 1930 – Taiwan, Ryukyu Islands
- Rhyparida sama Maulik, 1935 – Sumatra
- Rhyparida sangirensis Jacoby, 1894 – Sulawesi
- Rhyparida scotti Maulik, 1931 – Seychelles
- Rhyparida scutellata Baly, 1867 – Waigeo
- Rhyparida sedlaceki Gressitt, 1967 – Papua New Guinea
- Rhyparida semiflava Lea, 1915 – Australia
- Rhyparida semimetallica Gressitt, 1967 – Papua New Guinea
- Rhyparida seminigra Lea, 1915 – Australia
- Rhyparida semiopaca Lea, 1922 – Australia
- Rhyparida semipurpurea Jacoby, 1898 – Fergusson Island
- Rhyparida sepikana Gressitt, 1967 – Papua New Guinea
- Rhyparida seychellensis Maulik, 1931 – Seychelles
- Rhyparida signifera Weise, 1922 – Philippines
- Rhyparida silvicola Bryant, 1949 – New Guinea
- Rhyparida sinuata Gressitt, 1967 – Papua New Guinea, Western New Guinea
- Rhyparida sobria Gressitt, 1967 – Papua New Guinea
- Rhyparida sparsepunctata Medvedev, 2003 – Seram
- Rhyparida spiridonovi Romantsov & Moseyko, 2016 – Penang Island, Singapore
- Rhyparida spissa Weise, 1922 – Philippines
- Rhyparida straeleni Maulik, 1935 – New Guinea
- Rhyparida straminipennis Weise, 1923 – Australia
- Rhyparida strigicollis Jacoby, 1884 – Ternate
- Rhyparida strigosa (Bryant, 1946) – Fiji
- Rhyparida striola Weise, 1910 – Madagascar, Pemba Island
- Rhyparida subaeneicollis Fairmaire, 1879 – Samoa
- Rhyparida subangulata Lea, 1915 – Australia
- Rhyparida subcostata Jacoby, 1884 – Java
- Rhyparida sublaevicollis Jacoby, 1884 – Ambon
- Rhyparida submetallica Baly, 1867 – Sulawesi, Peninsular Malaysia (Malacca)
- Rhyparida sulawesianum Medvedev, 2009 – Sulawesi
- Rhyparida sulcata Baly, 1864 – Borneo
- Rhyparida sulcatipennis (Jacoby, 1896) – Sumatra
- Rhyparida sulcipennis (Jacoby, 1904)
- Rhyparida sumptuosa (Baly, 1862) – Peninsular Malaysia
- Rhyparida suspecta Baly, 1867 – Misool
- Rhyparida suturalis Jacoby, 1894 – Tanimbar Islands
- Rhyparida sylvatica Bryant, 1949 – New Guinea
- Rhyparida tabida Weise, 1922 – Philippines
- Rhyparida tenuis Lea, 1915 – Australia
- Rhyparida terminata Jacoby, 1884 – New Guinea
- Rhyparida tetraspilota Lea, 1915 – Australia
- Rhyparida thailandica Medvedev, 2001 – Southwestern China (Yunnan), Thailand, Laos
- Rhyparida tibiellus (Weise, 1922) – Philippines
- Rhyparida trapezicollis Fairmaire, 1879 – Fiji
- Rhyparida triangulifera Lea, 1915 – Australia
- Rhyparida trilineata Baly, 1864 – Western New Guinea
- Rhyparida trinotata Weise, 1916 – Australia
- Rhyparida tristis Baly, 1864 – New Guinea
- Rhyparida trivialis Gressitt, 1967 – Western New Guinea
- Rhyparida tropica Lea, 1915 – Australia
- Rhyparida tumifrons Baly, 1867 – Borneo
- Rhyparida uniformis Blackburn, 1889 – Australia
- Rhyparida vagans Lea, 1915 – Australia
- Rhyparida variipennis Lea, 1915 – Australia
- Rhyparida vermiculata Gressitt, 1957 – Fiji
- Rhyparida vilis Weise, 1923 – Australia
- Rhyparida viridana Jacoby, 1884 – New Guinea
- Rhyparida viridiaenea (Blanchard, 1853) – Australia
- Rhyparida viridipennis Jacoby, 1884 – New Guinea
- Rhyparida vittata (Blanchard, 1853) – Australia
- Rhyparida vittipennis Baly, 1864 – Flores
- Rhyparida vulnerata Lea, 1915 – Australia
- Rhyparida wallacei Baly, 1867
  - Rhyparida wallacei palauana Chûjô, 1943 – Palau, Micronesia (Yap)
  - Rhyparida wallacei wallacei Baly, 1867 – Borneo (Sarawak)
- Rhyparida weigeli Medvedev, 2015 – Sulawesi
- Rhyparida weiseana Medvedev, 1995 – Philippines
- Rhyparida weiseana Gomez-Zurita, 2011 (junior homonym of above) – Philippines
- Rhyparida wittmeri Medvedev, 2010 – Southwest India (Goa)
- Rhyparida yarrabensis Weise, 1923 – Australia

Renamed species:

- Rhyparida apicipennis Lea, 1915 (preoccupied by R. apicipennis Jacoby, 1898): renamed to Rhyparida leana Gomez-Zurita, 2011
- Rhyparida basileptoides Chûjô, 1956 (preoccupied by R. basileptoides Weise, 1923): renamed to Rhyparida formosana Aslam, 1968
- Rhyparida bimaculata Jacoby, 1898 (preoccupied by R. bimaculata Jacoby, 1889): renamed to Rhyparida bimaculipennis Achard, 1914
- Rhyparida megalops (Chen, 1935) (preoccupied by R. megalops Lea, 1915): renamed to Rhyparida faitsilongi Romantsov & Moseyko, 2016
- Rhyparida nigripes Jacoby, 1898 (preoccupied by R. nigripes (Lefèvre, 1885)): renamed to Rhyparida eunigripes Moseyko & Medvedev, 2005
- Rhyparida obliterata Weise, 1910 (preoccupied by R. obliterata Baly, 1867): renamed to Rhyparida subdeleta Weise, 1914
- Rhyparida pallida Jacoby, 1898 (preoccupied by R. pallidus (Lefèvre, 1890)): renamed to Rhyparida eupallida Moseyko & Medvedev, 2005
- Rhyparida pallidula Weise, 1922 (preoccupied by R. pallidula Lea, 1915): renamed to Rhyparida weiseana Gomez-Zurita, 2011
- Rhyparida prosternalis Lea, 1915 (preoccupied by R. prosternalis Jacoby, 1894): renamed to Rhyparida reiterata Gomez-Zurita, 2011

Synonyms:

- Rhyparida aterrima Jacoby, 1892: synonym of Cleoporus lateralis (Motschulsky, 1866)
- Rhyparida blackburni Jacoby, 1898: synonym of Rhyparida fulvolimbata Lefèvre, 1885
- Rhyparida howitti Baly, 1877: synonym of Rhyparida ruficollis (Clark, 1864)
- Rhyparida immaculata Jacoby, 1908: synonym of Rhyparida bimaculata Jacoby, 1889
- Rhyparida maculicollis Baly, 1877: synonym of Rhyparida fasciata Baly, 1864
- Rhyparida mastersi Blackburn, 1892: synonym of Rhyparida fasciata Baly, 1864
- Rhyparida mediopicta Blackburn, 1889: synonym of Rhyparida didyma (Fabricius, 1775)
- Rhyparida morosa Jacoby, 1884: synonym of Rhyparida nitida Clark, 1864
- Rhyparida opacicollis Baly, 1867: synonym of Rhyparida impuncticollis Baly, 1864
- Rhyparida ovalis Baly, 1867: synonym of Phytorus pinguis (Baly, 1867)
- Rhyparida phytorella Moseyko & Medvedev, 2005 (replacement name for Rhyparida simplex (Lefèvre, 1885)): synonym of Rhyparida lineolata (Weise, 1913)
- Rhyparida piceitarsis Blackburn, 1889: synonym of Rhyparida flava (Clark, 1864)
- Rhyparida satelles Blackburn, 1889: synonym of Rhyparida ruficollis (Clark, 1864)
- Rhyparida simplex (Clark, 1864): synonym of Rhyparida australis (Boheman, 1858)
- Rhyparida simplex (Lefèvre, 1885) (preoccupied by R. simplex (Clark, 1864)): synonym of Rhyparida lineolata (Weise, 1913)
- Rhyparida voeltzkowi Achard, 1914: synonym of Rhyparida subdeleta Weise, 1914

Species moved to Deretrichia:

- Rhyparida alternata Baly, 1864
- Rhyparida andaiensis Jacoby, 1894 (as andannensis?)
- Rhyparida approximata Baly, 1867
- Rhyparida bipustulata Baly, 1867
- Rhyparida brunnea Baly, 1867
- Rhyparida frontalis Baly, 1867
- Rhyparida inornata Baly, 1864
- Rhyparida intermedia Baly, 1867
- Rhyparida laevifrons Jacoby, 1884
- Rhyparida laticollis Baly, 1867
- Rhyparida plebeja Jacoby, 1894
- Rhyparida rothschildi Jacoby, 1894
- Rhyparida semipunctata Baly, 1867
- Rhyparida separata Baly, 1867
- Rhyparida sordida Baly, 1864
- Rhyparida sulcicollis Baly, 1867
- Rhyparida tibialis Baly, 1867
- Rhyparida timorensis Jacoby, 1894
- Rhyparida variabilis Baly, 1867

Species moved to Tricliona:

- Rhyparida armata Jacoby, 1889
- Rhyparida bengalensis Jacoby, 1908
- Rhyparida episternalis Weise, 1922
- Rhyparida quinquemaculata Jacoby, 1887
- Rhyparida raapi Jacoby, 1899

Species moved to other genera:

- Rhyparida buxtoni Bryant, 1936: moved to Rhyparidella
- Rhyparida picta Baly, 1867: moved to Phainodina
- Rhyparida subdeleta Weise, 1914: moved to Ivongius
