= Palimbolus foveicornis =

Scientific classification
- Domain: Eukaryota
- Kingdom: Animalia
- Phylum: Arthropoda
- Class: Insecta
- Order: Coleoptera
- Suborder: Polyphaga
- Infraorder: Staphyliniformia
- Family: Staphylinidae
- Genus: Palimbolus
- Species: P. foveicornis

Binomial name
- Palimbolus foveicornis Lea, 1911

Species of beetle

Palimbolus foveicornis is a beetle in the Staphylinidae (rove beetle) family, which is found in New South Wales and Queensland, east of the divide.

It was first described by Arthur Mills Lea in 1911.

== Description ==
Lea describes the species:

Male: Reddish-castaneous; elytra and appendages more or less flavous. Clotliiug rather long and moderately dense. Head with three interlocular foveae, of which the median one is slightly posterior to the others, these almost touching the eyes; with a strong depression between the interantennary ridges. Antennae fairly stout, extending to middle coxae, first joint cylindrical, as long as three following combined, ninth and tenth fairly large and transverse, eleventh briefly ovate, its undersurface strongly impressed or foveate towards base. Prothorax with sides strongly inflated slightly in advance of middle; with three longitudinal fovese, the median one confined to the basal third, but with a vague impression traceable from it almost to apex, the lateral ones distinct to in front of the middle; punctures rather indistinct. Elytra very decidedly wider than long, sides strongly dilated to apex; with four basal foveas; punctures indistinct. Abdomen decidedly wider than elytra, and about twice as long; undersurface flattened along middle and scarcely impressed. Metasternum depressed along middle. Hind tihioi with a strong subapical spur. Length 2½ mm.

Hab. — New South Wales : Sydney (H. J. Carter).

Readily distinguished from all previously described species by the conspicuous fovea on the undersurface of the eleventh joint. The impressions on the ventral segments are so feeble that from most directions they appear to be absent. The spur of the hind tibiae is so placed that the apex itself appears to be wide and triangularly notched. The elytra are shorter even than in P. mirandus P. armatus, described as having shorter elytra than in P. Victoriae, has the metasternum and abdomen very different.
