= Tinaroo apicicollis =

Scientific classification
- Domain: Eukaryota
- Kingdom: Animalia
- Phylum: Arthropoda
- Class: Insecta
- Order: Coleoptera
- Suborder: Polyphaga
- Infraorder: Staphyliniformia
- Family: Staphylinidae
- Genus: Tinaroo
- Species: T. apicicollis

Binomial name
- Tinaroo apicicollis (Lea, 1911)

Synonyms
- Batrisodes apicicollis Lea, 1911

Species of beetle

Tinaroo apicicollis is a beetle in the Staphylinidae family, which is found in New South Wales.

It was first described by Arthur Mills Lea in 1911 as Batrisodes apicicollis from a male specimen collected in the Illawarra.

== Description ==
Lea describes the species:

Male: Colour and clothing much as in the preceding species. Head rather convex; aiitennary tubercles rather small, a narrow impression between them; with a rather large ovate fovea close to each eye, closed behind but open in front; base obtusely notched. Antennae as in B. tenuicornis. Prothorax slightly longer than wide, widest at about apical third, thence strongly narrowed to apex and subarcuate to base; with deep irregular impressions; disc strongly raised. Elytra with dorsal striae distinct only on basal slope, but traceable to basal third; shoulders unarmed. Metasternum strongly impressed along middle. Trochanters unarmed. Length 2 1/6 mm.

Hab. — N.S.Wales: lllawarra (H. J. Carter).

The prothorax is very irregularly sculptured; near the base there is a deep fovea, from some directions appearing almost round, from others somewhat V-shaped and shallowly and irregularly connected with the sides. On each side of the base there is a small isolated fovea, and two suboblique impressions close together and connected at their apices. The dilated sides about the apex have distinct punctures, and are separated from the disc by deep lines. The disc is strongly raised and is triangularly pointed in front (a character which will readily distinguish it from the preceding species), the point being level with the middle of the dilated lateral parts; the whole of the space in front, and at the sides of it, is largely and irregularly impressed, but the impressions are somewhat obscured by the clothing.
