= Liparetrus lepidopygus =

Scientific classification
- Kingdom: Animalia
- Phylum: Arthropoda
- Clade: Pancrustacea
- Class: Insecta
- Order: Coleoptera
- Suborder: Polyphaga
- Infraorder: Scarabaeiformia
- Family: Scarabaeidae
- Genus: Liparetrus
- Species: L. lepidopygus

Binomial name
- Liparetrus lepidopygus Lea, 1917

Synonyms
- Liparetrus trichosternus Lea, 1917

Species of beetle

Liparetrus lepidopygus is a species of beetle of the family Scarabaeidae. It is found in Australia (Western Australia).

== Taxonomy ==
This species belongs to the luridipennis species group. The defining characters of this group include setae on the disc of the pronotum.

== Description ==
Adults reach a length of about 6.5–9 mm (0.26–0.35 in). The head, pronotum, abdomen and ventral surface are black, while the elytra are yellowish brown with a black base.
