= Liparetrus nudus =

Scientific classification
- Kingdom: Animalia
- Phylum: Arthropoda
- Clade: Pancrustacea
- Class: Insecta
- Order: Coleoptera
- Suborder: Polyphaga
- Infraorder: Scarabaeiformia
- Family: Scarabaeidae
- Genus: Liparetrus
- Species: L. nudus

Binomial name
- Liparetrus nudus Lea, 1917

Species of beetle

Liparetrus nudus is a species of beetle of the family Scarabaeidae. It is found in Australia (Western Australia).

== Taxonomy ==
This species belongs to the rufipennis species group. The defining characters of this group include the absence of setae and scales on the disc of the pronotum.

== Description ==
Adults reach a length of about 6 mm (0.24 in). The head, pronotum, abdomen and ventral surface are black, while the elytra are pale reddish brown with a black base. The antennae are pale yellowish brown.
