= Ataenius integricollis =

Scientific classification
- Kingdom: Animalia
- Phylum: Arthropoda
- Clade: Pancrustacea
- Class: Insecta
- Order: Coleoptera
- Suborder: Polyphaga
- Infraorder: Scarabaeiformia
- Family: Scarabaeidae
- Genus: Ataenius
- Species: A. integricollis

Binomial name
- Ataenius integricollis Lea, 1923

Species of beetle

Ataenius integricollis is a species of beetle of the family Scarabaeidae. It is found in Australia (New South Wales).

== Description ==
Adults reach a length of about 3.8–4.2 mm (0.15–0.17 in). They have an elongate, reddish black to black body, with the upper surface alutaceous. The head and pronotum are sometimes darker than elytra, and sometimes the apex of the elytra is reddish.
