= Tesarius sulcipennis =

Scientific classification
- Kingdom: Animalia
- Phylum: Arthropoda
- Clade: Pancrustacea
- Class: Insecta
- Order: Coleoptera
- Suborder: Polyphaga
- Infraorder: Scarabaeiformia
- Family: Scarabaeidae
- Genus: Tesarius
- Species: T. sulcipennis

Binomial name
- Tesarius sulcipennis (Lea, 1904)

Synonyms
- Phycochus sulcipennis Lea, 1904

Species of beetle

Tesarius sulcipennis is a species of beetle of the family Scarabaeidae. It is found in Australia (Tasmania) and New Zealand.

== Description ==
Adults reach a length of about 2.8–3.2 mm (0.11–0.13 in). They have a strongly convex, shiny, reddish-brown to brownish-black body. The legs and the underside are lighter in most specimens.

== Life history ==
They inhabit coastal sand dunes.
