= Kyogle bryophilus =

Scientific classification
- Domain: Eukaryota
- Kingdom: Animalia
- Phylum: Arthropoda
- Class: Insecta
- Order: Coleoptera
- Suborder: Polyphaga
- Infraorder: Staphyliniformia
- Family: Staphylinidae
- Genus: Kyogle
- Species: K. bryophilus

Binomial name
- Kyogle bryophilus (Arthur Mills Lea, 1911)

Synonyms
- Euplectops bryophilus Lea, 1911

Insect species

Kyogle bryophilus is a beetle in the Staphylinidae family, native to Tasmania.

It was first described by Arthur Mills Lea in 1911 as Euplectops bryophilus, from male and female specimens collected in Tasmania, from near Hobart and New Norfolk.

== Description ==
Lea described Euplectops bryophilus as:

(Male) reddish-castaneous, appendages somewhat paler. Moderately densely clothed with rather long, pale pubescence, with a few longer hairs scattered about. Head with a deep curved impression, the ends of which appear as interocular foveae, base obtusely notched; antennary tubercles fairly large but obtuse. Antennae as in the preceding species, except that the eleventh joint is rather more pointed. Prothorax somewhat depressed, sides evenly and rather strongly rounded; with a fairly deep and wide impression close to base; with three longitudinal impressions, of which the lateral ones are short and each terminates in a foveate expansion of the basal impression; the median impression is very feeble, and invisible from most directions. Elytra moderately convex, rather longer than usual; with eight small basal foveae; dorsal striae generally traceable to about middle, but distinct only at base; punctures more or less concealed. Abdomen with node absent or concealed; under surface feebly flattened along middle. Metasternum shallowly impressed along middle. Front trochanters obtusely dentate. Length 1mm.

(female) Differs in having the antennae thinner, cephalic impressions less pronounced, metasternum and abdomen rather strongly convex along middle, and trochanters unarmed.
Hab. — Tasmania: Waratah, Hobart, New Norfolk; in all cases in moss(A. M. Lea).

In general appearance very close to the preceding species, except that it is smaller, but with the median line scarcely (on some specimens not at all) visible, and terminal joint of antennae even more pointed. The disc of each elytron, as in most species parts appear in two almost semicircular lobes. On an occasional specimen the eleventh joint appears as a rather elongated triangle, its apex is strongly produced, in the male especially, and as it is usually terminated by a pencil of hairs, it appears to be considerably longer than it really is. The subsutural striae are rather less distinct than usual.
