= Ataenius parvus =

Scientific classification
- Kingdom: Animalia
- Phylum: Arthropoda
- Clade: Pancrustacea
- Class: Insecta
- Order: Coleoptera
- Suborder: Polyphaga
- Infraorder: Scarabaeiformia
- Family: Scarabaeidae
- Genus: Ataenius
- Species: A. parvus

Binomial name
- Ataenius parvus Lea, 1923

Species of beetle

Ataenius parvus is a species of beetle of the family Scarabaeidae. It is found in Australia (Western Australia).

== Description ==
Adults reach a length of about 2.5–2.9 mm (0.098–0.114 in). They have an oblong-oval, shining, piceous body, with the anterior margin of the clypeus and legs reddish-brown.
