= Liparetrus laciniatus =

Scientific classification
- Kingdom: Animalia
- Phylum: Arthropoda
- Clade: Pancrustacea
- Class: Insecta
- Order: Coleoptera
- Suborder: Polyphaga
- Infraorder: Scarabaeiformia
- Family: Scarabaeidae
- Genus: Liparetrus
- Species: L. laciniatus

Binomial name
- Liparetrus laciniatus Lea, 1917

Species of beetle

Liparetrus laciniatus is a species of beetle of the family Scarabaeidae. It is found in Australia (Queensland).

== Taxonomy ==
This species belongs to the rufipennis species group. The defining characters of this group include the absence of setae and scales on the disc of the pronotum.

== Description ==
Adults reach a length of about 10 mm (0.39 in). The head is black, while the pronotum is black or reddish brown and the ventral surface is black or dark brown. The elytra are reddish brown and darkened at the base. The propygidium and pygidium are reddish brown.
