= Ataenius illaetabilis =

Scientific classification
- Kingdom: Animalia
- Phylum: Arthropoda
- Clade: Pancrustacea
- Class: Insecta
- Order: Coleoptera
- Suborder: Polyphaga
- Infraorder: Scarabaeiformia
- Family: Scarabaeidae
- Genus: Ataenius
- Species: A. illaetabilis

Binomial name
- Ataenius illaetabilis Lea, 1923

Species of beetle

Ataenius illaetabilis is a species of beetle of the family Scarabaeidae. It is found in Australia (Northern Territory, Western Australia).

== Description ==
Adults reach a length of about 2.8–3.8 mm (0.11–0.15 in). They have an elongate, opaque, nearly glabrous, rusty brown, blackish-brown or black body. The pronotum and apex of the elytra sometimes have tiny setae and the elytra are lighter than the pronotum in some specimens. Often, the dorsal surface is partly covered with an argillaceous coating.
