= Liparetrus geminatus =

Scientific classification
- Kingdom: Animalia
- Phylum: Arthropoda
- Clade: Pancrustacea
- Class: Insecta
- Order: Coleoptera
- Suborder: Polyphaga
- Infraorder: Scarabaeiformia
- Family: Scarabaeidae
- Genus: Liparetrus
- Species: L. geminatus

Binomial name
- Liparetrus geminatus Lea, 1924

Species of beetle

Liparetrus geminatus is a species of beetle of the family Scarabaeidae. It is found in Australia (South Australia).

== Taxonomy ==
This species belongs to the laetus species group.

== Description ==
Adults reach a length of about 4.5 mm (0.18 in). The body, including the antennae and legs, is pale yellowish brown, but the frons is black. The ventral thorax and base of the abdomen are sometimes black however.
