= Liparetrus cribripennis =

Scientific classification
- Kingdom: Animalia
- Phylum: Arthropoda
- Clade: Pancrustacea
- Class: Insecta
- Order: Coleoptera
- Suborder: Polyphaga
- Infraorder: Scarabaeiformia
- Family: Scarabaeidae
- Genus: Liparetrus
- Species: L. cribripennis

Binomial name
- Liparetrus cribripennis Lea, 1924

Species of beetle

Liparetrus cribripennis is a species of beetle of the family Scarabaeidae. It is found in Australia (Western Australia).

== Taxonomy ==
This species belongs to the laetus species group.

== Description ==
Adults reach a length of about 8 mm (0.31 in). The body is either completely black, or has dark reddish brown elytra. The legs are dark reddish brown and the antennae are reddish brown with the distal part of the club black.
