= Ataenius eurynotus =

Scientific classification
- Kingdom: Animalia
- Phylum: Arthropoda
- Clade: Pancrustacea
- Class: Insecta
- Order: Coleoptera
- Suborder: Polyphaga
- Infraorder: Scarabaeiformia
- Family: Scarabaeidae
- Genus: Ataenius
- Species: A. eurynotus

Binomial name
- Ataenius eurynotus Lea, 1923

Species of beetle

Ataenius eurynotus is a species of beetle of the family Scarabaeidae. It is found in Australia (Northern Territory, Queensland, Western Australia).

== Description ==
Adults reach a length of about 3.8–4.8 mm (0.15–0.19 in). They have an oblong-oval, convex, slightly shining, reddish-black to black body, with the anterior of the clypeus and legs reddish.
