= Ataenius basiceps =

Scientific classification
- Kingdom: Animalia
- Phylum: Arthropoda
- Clade: Pancrustacea
- Class: Insecta
- Order: Coleoptera
- Suborder: Polyphaga
- Infraorder: Scarabaeiformia
- Family: Scarabaeidae
- Genus: Ataenius
- Species: A. basiceps

Binomial name
- Ataenius basiceps Lea, 1923

Species of beetle

Ataenius basiceps is a species of beetle of the family Scarabaeidae. It is found in Australia (Australian Capital Territory, Tasmania, Victoria).

== Description ==
Adults reach a length of about 4.5–5 mm (0.18–0.20 in). They have an oblong-oval, alutaceous, glabrous, black body, usually covered with an argillaceous coating. The side margins of the pronotum and the legs are reddish-brown.
