= Liparetrus cribriceps =

Scientific classification
- Kingdom: Animalia
- Phylum: Arthropoda
- Clade: Pancrustacea
- Class: Insecta
- Order: Coleoptera
- Suborder: Polyphaga
- Infraorder: Scarabaeiformia
- Family: Scarabaeidae
- Genus: Liparetrus
- Species: L. cribriceps

Binomial name
- Liparetrus cribriceps Lea, 1924

Species of beetle

Liparetrus cribriceps is a species of beetle of the family Scarabaeidae. It is found in Australia (Western Australia).

== Taxonomy ==
This species belongs to the luridipennis species group. The defining characters of this group include setae on the disc of the pronotum.

== Description ==
Adults reach a length of about 8.5 mm (0.33 in). The head, pronotum, scutellum, abdomen and ventral surface are shining black, while the elytra are pale yellowish brown, slightly iridescent and with the base and lateral margins dark brown or black. The legs are dark brown or black and the antennae are brown or dark brown.
