= Eupines inermis =

Scientific classification
- Kingdom: Animalia
- Phylum: Arthropoda
- Clade: Pancrustacea
- Class: Insecta
- Order: Coleoptera
- Suborder: Polyphaga
- Infraorder: Staphyliniformia
- Family: Staphylinidae
- Genus: Eupines
- Species: E. inermis

Binomial name
- Eupines inermis Lea, 1911

Species of beetle

Eupines inermis is a beetle in the Staphylinidae family, which is found in New South Wales.

It was first described by Arthur Mills Lea in 1911.
