= Podotenus integrifrons =

Scientific classification
- Kingdom: Animalia
- Phylum: Arthropoda
- Clade: Pancrustacea
- Class: Insecta
- Order: Coleoptera
- Suborder: Polyphaga
- Infraorder: Scarabaeiformia
- Family: Scarabaeidae
- Genus: Podotenus
- Species: P. integrifrons

Binomial name
- Podotenus integrifrons (Lea, 1923)

Synonyms
- Aphodius integrifrons Lea, 1923

Species of beetle

Podotenus integrifrons is a species of beetle of the family Scarabaeidae. It is found in Australia (Queensland).

== Description ==
Adults reach a length of about 6.9–7.2 mm (0.27–0.28 in). They have an elongate-oval, somewhat shining, rusty-brown body, with the sides of the pronotum and ventral surface yellowish and with pale setae.

== Life history ==
Specimens have been found in human dung.
