= Liparetrus quinquelobatus =

Scientific classification
- Kingdom: Animalia
- Phylum: Arthropoda
- Clade: Pancrustacea
- Class: Insecta
- Order: Coleoptera
- Suborder: Polyphaga
- Infraorder: Scarabaeiformia
- Family: Scarabaeidae
- Genus: Liparetrus
- Species: L. quinquelobatus

Binomial name
- Liparetrus quinquelobatus Lea, 1919

Species of beetle

Liparetrus quinquelobatus is a species of beetle of the family Scarabaeidae. It is found in Australia (Queensland).

== Taxonomy ==
This species belongs to the rufipennis species group. The defining characters of this group include the absence of setae and scales on the disc of the pronotum.

== Description ==
Adults reach a length of about 8 mm (0.31 in). The head, pronotum, scutellum, abdomen and ventral surface are dark brown to black and the elytra are pale yellowish brown. The legs are reddish brown and the antennae are pale yellowish brown.
