= Candezeollus bicrenulatus =

Scientific classification
- Kingdom: Animalia
- Phylum: Arthropoda
- Clade: Pancrustacea
- Class: Insecta
- Order: Coleoptera
- Suborder: Polyphaga
- Infraorder: Scarabaeiformia
- Family: Scarabaeidae
- Genus: Candezeollus
- Species: C. bicrenulatus

Binomial name
- Candezeollus bicrenulatus (Lea, 1923)

Synonyms
- Aphodius bicrenulatus Lea, 1923

Species of beetle

Candezeollus bicrenulatus is a species of beetle of the family Scarabaeidae. It is found in Australia (Western Australia).

== Description ==
Adults reach a length of about 6 mm (0.24 in). They have a convex, oval, shining, reddish-brown body.
