= Liparetrus bimaculatus =

Scientific classification
- Kingdom: Animalia
- Phylum: Arthropoda
- Clade: Pancrustacea
- Class: Insecta
- Order: Coleoptera
- Suborder: Polyphaga
- Infraorder: Scarabaeiformia
- Family: Scarabaeidae
- Genus: Liparetrus
- Species: L. bimaculatus

Binomial name
- Liparetrus bimaculatus Lea, 1917

Species of beetle

Liparetrus bimaculatus is a species of beetle of the family Scarabaeidae. It is found in Australia (Northern Territory).

== Taxonomy ==
This species belongs to the discoidalis species group. The defining characters of this group include the pronotum with setae, but with scales on the disc.

== Description ==
Adults reach a length of about 5 mm (0.20 in). The head, pronotum, scutellum, abdomen and ventral surface are black, while the elytra are dark brown with yellow spots near the base. The antennae and anterior legs are reddish yellow.
