= Liparetrus flavicornis =

Scientific classification
- Kingdom: Animalia
- Phylum: Arthropoda
- Clade: Pancrustacea
- Class: Insecta
- Order: Coleoptera
- Suborder: Polyphaga
- Infraorder: Scarabaeiformia
- Family: Scarabaeidae
- Genus: Liparetrus
- Species: L. flavicornis

Binomial name
- Liparetrus flavicornis Lea, 1917

Species of beetle

Liparetrus flavicornis is a species of beetle of the family Scarabaeidae. It is found in Australia (South Australia).

== Taxonomy ==
This species belongs to the marginipennis species group. The defining characters of this group include the presence of setae on the disc of the pronotum. The elytra normally also have setae on the disc, but these may be absent, in which case there is at least a continuous fringe of setae on the anterior margin.

== Description ==
Adults reach a length of about 6 mm (0.24 in). The head, pronotum and scutellum are black, while the elytra are yellowish brown with darkened margins. The abdomen is dark brown, the legs reddish brown and the antennae pale yellow.
