= Liparetrus tibialis =

Scientific classification
- Kingdom: Animalia
- Phylum: Arthropoda
- Clade: Pancrustacea
- Class: Insecta
- Order: Coleoptera
- Suborder: Polyphaga
- Infraorder: Scarabaeiformia
- Family: Scarabaeidae
- Genus: Liparetrus
- Species: L. tibialis

Binomial name
- Liparetrus tibialis Lea, 1924

Species of beetle

Liparetrus tibialis is a species of beetle of the family Scarabaeidae. It is found in Australia (South Australia, Victoria).

== Taxonomy ==
This species belongs to the striatus species group. The defining characters of this group include the absence of setae on the disc of the pronotum and scales or flattened, adpressed setae on the propygidium and usually also the pygidium.

== Description ==
Adults reach a length of about 4–4.5 mm (0.16–0.18 in). The clypeus is black or reddish brown and the frons is black. The pronotum is black in males, while it is reddish yellow with black anterior and posterior edges in females. The elytra are pale yellowish brown, the abdomen is pale reddish yellow and the ventral surface is dark brown. The scutellum is black, the legs reddish brown and the antennae are reddish with a piceous club.
