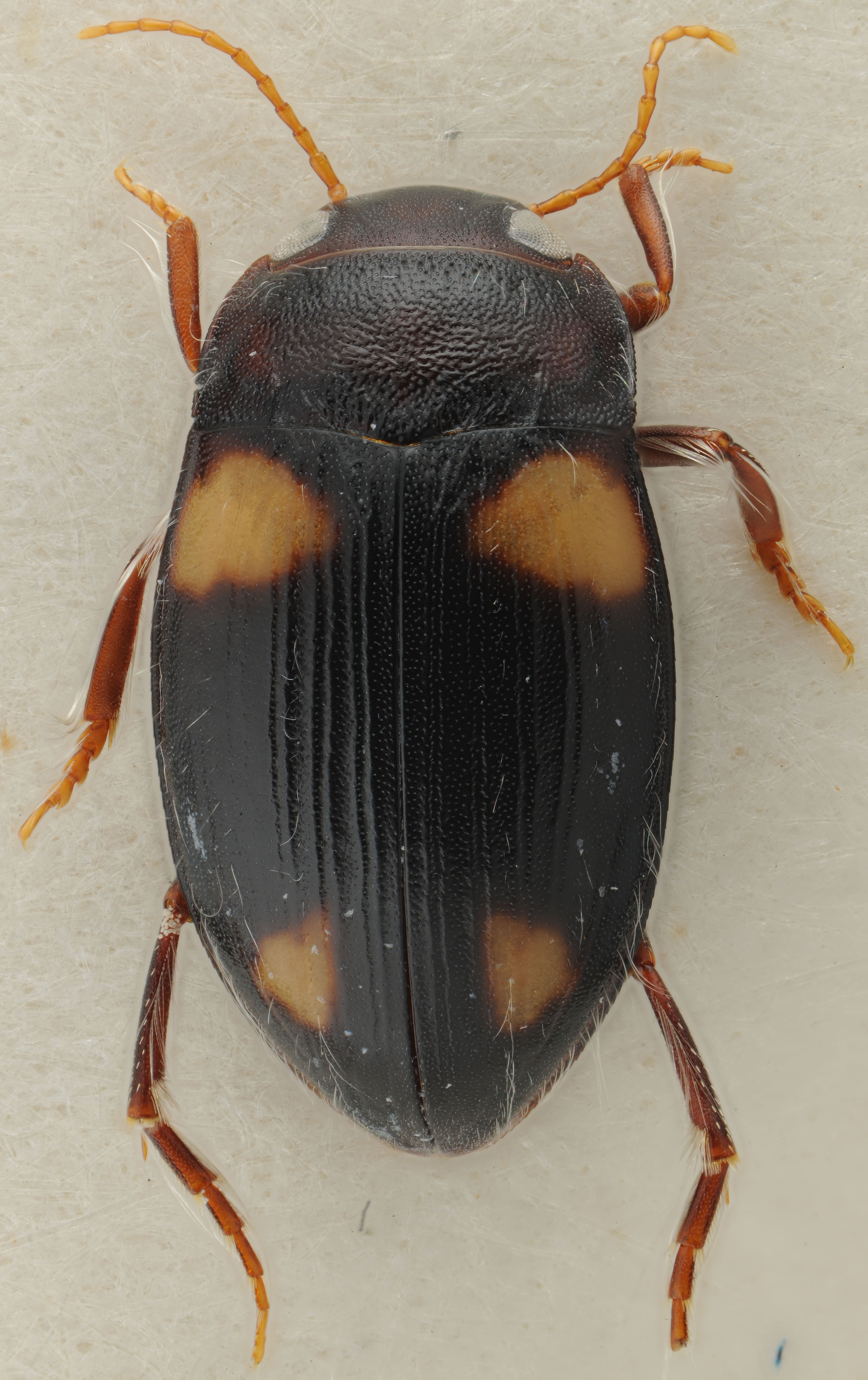
- Barretthydrus tibialis

Scientific classification
- Kingdom: Animalia
- Phylum: Arthropoda
- Class: Insecta
- Order: Coleoptera
- Suborder: Adephaga
- Family: Dytiscidae
- Genus: Barretthydrus; Lea, 1927

= Barretthydrus =

Genus of beetles

Barretthydrus is a genus of beetles in the family Dytiscidae, first described in 1927 by Arthur Mills Lea. The type species is Barretthydrus geminatus.

The genus is endemic to Australia, where it is found in New South Wales in the drainage basins of the Murray-Darling, and in coastal drainage basins, along the east coast from Queensland to Victoria.

The genus contains the following species:

- Barretthydrus geminatus Lea, 1927
- Barretthydrus stepheni Watts, 1978
- Barretthydrus tibialis Lea, 1927
