= Rhyparida angustata =

Scientific classification
- Kingdom: Animalia
- Phylum: Arthropoda
- Clade: Pancrustacea
- Class: Insecta
- Order: Coleoptera
- Suborder: Polyphaga
- Infraorder: Cucujiformia
- Family: Chrysomelidae
- Genus: Rhyparida
- Species: R. angustata

Binomial name
- Rhyparida angustata Jacoby, 1894

Species of beetles

Rhyparida angustata is a species of beetle in the leaf beetle family (Chrysomelidae). It is recorded from "Andai", a locality on the island of New Guinea. The scientific name of the species was published in 1894 by Martin Jacoby.
