= Proctophanes minor =

Scientific classification
- Kingdom: Animalia
- Phylum: Arthropoda
- Clade: Pancrustacea
- Class: Insecta
- Order: Coleoptera
- Suborder: Polyphaga
- Infraorder: Scarabaeiformia
- Family: Scarabaeidae
- Genus: Proctophanes
- Species: P. minor

Binomial name
- Proctophanes minor (Blackburn, 1897)

Synonyms
- Proctammodes minor Blackburn, 1897

Species of beetle

Proctophanes minor is a species of beetle of the family Scarabaeidae. It is found in Australia (Tasmania, Victoria) and New Zealand.

== Description ==
Adults reach a length of about 3.2–3.8 mm (0.13–0.15 in). They have a short oval, moderately shiny, piceous black body. In some specimens, the elytra are lighter than the fore body.
