= Candezeollus pseudocandezei =

Scientific classification
- Kingdom: Animalia
- Phylum: Arthropoda
- Clade: Pancrustacea
- Class: Insecta
- Order: Coleoptera
- Suborder: Polyphaga
- Infraorder: Scarabaeiformia
- Family: Scarabaeidae
- Genus: Candezeollus
- Species: C. pseudocandezei

Binomial name
- Candezeollus pseudocandezei Stebnicka & Howden, 1995

Species of beetle

Candezeollus pseudocandezei is a species of beetle of the family Scarabaeidae. It is found in Australia (South Australia, Victoria).

== Description ==
Adults reach a length of about 6.3–7.5 mm (0.25–0.30 in). They have an elongate-oval, shining, yellowish brown body, with most of the head, the disc of the pronotum and elytral spots dark brown to black, and the legs yellowish brown.
