= Proctophanes caldwellensis =

Scientific classification
- Kingdom: Animalia
- Phylum: Arthropoda
- Clade: Pancrustacea
- Class: Insecta
- Order: Coleoptera
- Suborder: Polyphaga
- Infraorder: Scarabaeiformia
- Family: Scarabaeidae
- Genus: Proctophanes
- Species: P. caldwellensis

Binomial name
- Proctophanes caldwellensis Stebnicka & Howden, 1995

Species of beetle

Proctophanes caldwellensis is a species of beetle of the family Scarabaeidae. It is found in Australia (New South Wales, Queensland).

== Description ==
Adults reach a length of about 4.5–5 mm (0.18–0.20 in). They have a shining body, with the head and pronotum black, but the sides of the pronotum, elytra and legs reddish-brown. The ventral surface is castaneous.
