= Proctophanes distinguendus =

Scientific classification
- Kingdom: Animalia
- Phylum: Arthropoda
- Clade: Pancrustacea
- Class: Insecta
- Order: Coleoptera
- Suborder: Polyphaga
- Infraorder: Scarabaeiformia
- Family: Scarabaeidae
- Genus: Proctophanes
- Species: P. distinguendus

Binomial name
- Proctophanes distinguendus (Schmidt, 1910)

Synonyms
- Aphodius (Mendidius) distinguendus Schmidt, 1910

Species of beetle

Proctophanes distinguendus is a species of beetle of the family Scarabaeidae. It is found in Australia (New South Wales, South Australia) and is an introduced species in Indonesia (Molluccas).

== Description ==
Adults reach a length of about 4–5 mm (0.16–0.20 in). They have a shining body, with the head and pronotum black or brownish-black, and part of the head, sides of the pronotum, elytra and legs red or reddish-brown.
