= Candezeollus candezei =

Scientific classification
- Kingdom: Animalia
- Phylum: Arthropoda
- Clade: Pancrustacea
- Class: Insecta
- Order: Coleoptera
- Suborder: Polyphaga
- Infraorder: Scarabaeiformia
- Family: Scarabaeidae
- Genus: Candezeollus
- Species: C. candezei

Binomial name
- Candezeollus candezei (Harold, 1868)

Synonyms
- Aphodius candezei Harold, 1868

Species of beetle

Candezeollus candezei is a species of beetle of the family Scarabaeidae. It is found in Australia (South Australia).

== Description ==
Adults reach a length of about 6.5–7.5 mm (0.26–0.30 in). They have an oblong-oval, convex, shining, purplish brown body, with the head, disc of the pronotum, elytral spots and tibiae darker.
