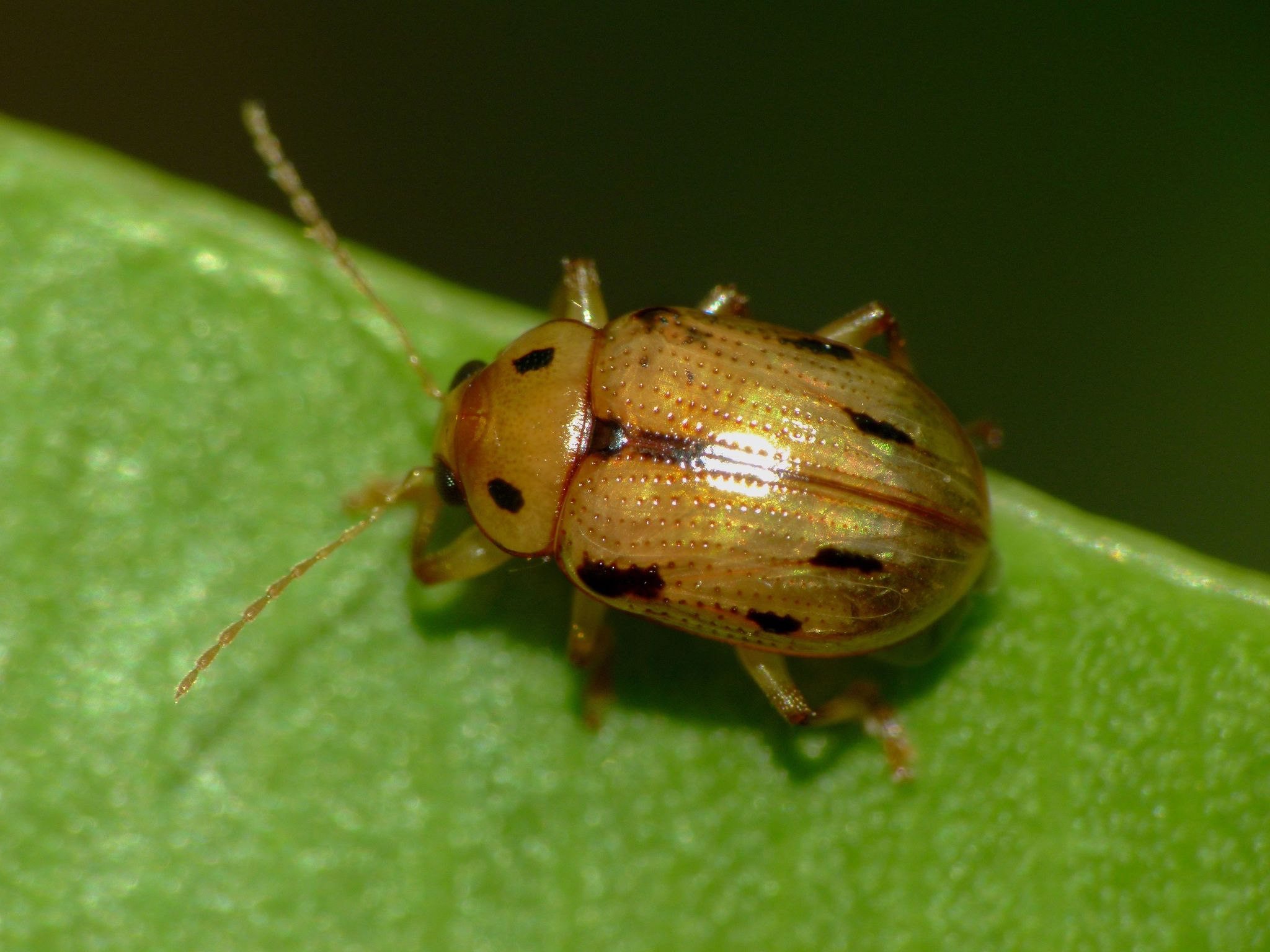
- Rhyparida brevilineata

Scientific classification
- Kingdom: Animalia
- Phylum: Arthropoda
- Clade: Pancrustacea
- Class: Insecta
- Order: Coleoptera
- Suborder: Polyphaga
- Infraorder: Cucujiformia
- Family: Chrysomelidae
- Genus: Rhyparida
- Species: R. brevilineata

Binomial name
- Rhyparida brevilineata Jacoby, 1898

= Rhyparida brevilineata =

Species of beetles

Rhyparida brevilineata is a species of beetle in the leaf beetle family (Chrysomelidae). It is endemic to Australia. The scientific name of the species was published in 1898 by Martin Jacoby, who described it from North Australia.

== Description ==
Piceous, head, the antennae and thorax fulvous, the latter finely punctured with two black spots, elytra strongly punctate-striate to the apex, flavous, the suture and two short stripes below the middle, piceous, legs flavous, the knees black.
