= Podotenus =

- Podotenus callabonnensis

Scientific classification
- Kingdom: Animalia
- Phylum: Arthropoda
- Clade: Pancrustacea
- Class: Insecta
- Order: Coleoptera
- Suborder: Polyphaga
- Infraorder: Scarabaeiformia
- Family: Scarabaeidae
- Subfamily: Aphodiinae
- Tribe: Aphodiini
- Genus: Podotenus; Schmidt, 1914

Synonyms
- Aphodius (Podotenus) Schmidt, 1914; Trogaphodius Balthasar, 1965

Genus of beetles

Podotenus is a genus of beetles of the family Scarabaeidae.

== Species ==
- Podotenus arrowsmithensis Stebnicka & Howden, 1994
- Podotenus athertonensis Stebnicka & Howden, 1994
- Podotenus badgingarrae Stebnicka & Howden, 1994
- Podotenus baldiensis (Blackburn, 1904)
- Podotenus barringtonensis Stebnicka & Howden, 1994
- Podotenus bourkensis Stebnicka & Howden, 1994
- Podotenus callabonnensis (Blackburn, 1895)
- Podotenus channonensis Stebnicka & Howden, 1994
- Podotenus coffensis Stebnicka & Howden, 1994
- Podotenus dilgryensis Stebnicka & Howden, 1994
- Podotenus erosus (Erichson, 1842)
- Podotenus forrestensis Stebnicka & Howden, 1994
- Podotenus gallagheri Stebnicka & Howden, 1994
- Podotenus gracilipes (Harold, 1867)
- Podotenus insignior (Blackburn, 1904)
- Podotenus integrifrons (Lea, 1923)
- Podotenus kulkynensis Stebnicka & Howden, 1995
- Podotenus lindensis (Blackburn, 1892)
- Podotenus mattewsi Stebnicka & Howden, 1994
- Podotenus nigrosetosus Stebnicka & Howden, 1994
- Podotenus oodlawirraensis Stebnicka & Howden, 1994
- Podotenus otwayensis Stebnicka & Howden, 1994
- Podotenus pseudovictoriae Stebnicka & Howden, 1994
- Podotenus schmidti Stebnicka & Howden, 1994
- Podotenus storeyi Stebnicka & Howden, 1994
- Podotenus suberosus (Blackburn, 1904)
- Podotenus subfuscus (Petrovitz, 1975)
- Podotenus tennantensis Stebnicka & Howden, 1995
- Podotenus toowoombaensis Stebnicka & Howden, 1994
- Podotenus tricolor (Lea, 1923)
- Podotenus victoriae (Blackburn, 1897)
- Podotenus wauchopensis Stebnicka & Howden, 1994
- Podotenus williamsi Stebnicka & Howden, 1994
