= Helluarchus =

Scientific classification
- Kingdom: Animalia
- Phylum: Arthropoda
- Class: Insecta
- Order: Coleoptera
- Suborder: Adephaga
- Family: Carabidae
- Subfamily: Anthiinae
- Tribe: Helluonini
- Subtribe: Helluonina
- Genus: Helluarchus; Sloane, 1914

Genus of beetles

Helluarchus is a genus of carabids in the beetle family Carabidae. There are at least two described species in Helluarchus, found in Australia.

== Species ==
These two species belong to the genus Helluarchus:

- Helluarchus robustus Sloane, 1914
- Helluarchus whitei Lea, 1914
