= Rhyparida adonarae =

Scientific classification
- Kingdom: Animalia
- Phylum: Arthropoda
- Clade: Pancrustacea
- Class: Insecta
- Order: Coleoptera
- Suborder: Polyphaga
- Infraorder: Cucujiformia
- Family: Chrysomelidae
- Genus: Rhyparida
- Species: R. adonarae

Binomial name
- Rhyparida adonarae Jacoby, 1894

Species of beetles

Rhyparida adonarae is a species of beetle in the leaf beetle family (Chrysomelidae). It is recorded only from Adonara, an island in the Lesser Sunda Islands of Indonesia. The scientific name of the species was published in 1894 by Martin Jacoby.

== Description ==
It is fulvous, opaque, clypeus not separated from the face, head and thorax im-punctate, elytra strongly punctate-striate, black, the base narrowly, and (sometimes) the apex, fulvous; femora unarmed.

Head entirely impunctate, the clypeus not separated, impunctate, antennae fulvous, thorax more than twice as broad as long, the sides rather strongly rounded near the base, narrowed anteriorly, the anterior angles slightly thickened but not produced into a tooth, surface entirely impunctate, opaque, fulvous; seutellum broader than long, its apex rounded, fulvous; elytra not wider at the base than the thorax, without basal depression, moderately strongly punctate-striate anteriorly, more finely so towards the apex, black, the basal margin, and (in one specimen) the apex, fulvous.
