= Rhyparida longipes =

Scientific classification
- Kingdom: Animalia
- Phylum: Arthropoda
- Clade: Pancrustacea
- Class: Insecta
- Order: Coleoptera
- Suborder: Polyphaga
- Infraorder: Cucujiformia
- Family: Chrysomelidae
- Genus: Rhyparida
- Species: R. longipes

Binomial name
- Rhyparida longipes Jacoby, 1894

Species of beetles

Rhyparida longipes is a species of beetle in the leaf beetle family (Chrysomelidae). It is recorded only from Yos Sudarso Bay (formerly Humboldt Bay), a small bay on the north coast of New Guinea, in the Indonesian province of Papua. The scientific name of the species was published in 1894 by Martin Jacoby.
