= Podotenus kulkynensis =

Scientific classification
- Kingdom: Animalia
- Phylum: Arthropoda
- Clade: Pancrustacea
- Class: Insecta
- Order: Coleoptera
- Suborder: Polyphaga
- Infraorder: Scarabaeiformia
- Family: Scarabaeidae
- Genus: Podotenus
- Species: P. kulkynensis

Binomial name
- Podotenus kulkynensis Stebnicka & Howden, 1995

Species of beetle

Podotenus kulkynensis is a species of beetle of the family Scarabaeidae. It is found in Australia (Victoria).

== Description ==
Adults reach a length of about 6.1–6.4 mm (0.24–0.25 in). They have a slender, sub-depressed, slightly shining, dark brown body with pale setae. Part of the head, the sides of the pronotum and legs are yellow, while the elytra are dark brown, sometimes with lighter markings. The ventral surface is light brown.
