= Tesarius oregonensis =

Scientific classification
- Kingdom: Animalia
- Phylum: Arthropoda
- Clade: Pancrustacea
- Class: Insecta
- Order: Coleoptera
- Suborder: Polyphaga
- Infraorder: Scarabaeiformia
- Family: Scarabaeidae
- Genus: Tesarius
- Species: T. oregonensis

Binomial name
- Tesarius oregonensis (Cartwright, 1955)

Synonyms
- Psammodius oregonensis Cartwright, 1955

Species of beetle

Tesarius oregonensis is a species of aphodiine dung beetle in the family Scarabaeidae. It is found in Canada (British Columbia) and the United States (from Oregon to California).
