= Proctophanes sculptus =

Scientific classification
- Kingdom: Animalia
- Phylum: Arthropoda
- Clade: Pancrustacea
- Class: Insecta
- Order: Coleoptera
- Suborder: Polyphaga
- Infraorder: Scarabaeiformia
- Family: Scarabaeidae
- Genus: Proctophanes
- Species: P. sculptus

Binomial name
- Proctophanes sculptus (Hope, 1846)

Synonyms
- Aphodius sculptus Hope, 1846

Species of beetle

Proctophanes sculptus is a species of beetle of the family Scarabaeidae. It is found in Australia (Capital Territory, New South Wales, Tasmania, Queensland, Victoria) and New Zealand.

== Description ==
Adults reach a length of about 5–6.2 mm (0.20–0.24 in). They have a robust, shiny, piceous black body.

== Life history ==
Specimens have been collected in cattle and horse dung and in marsupial droppings.
