= Proctophanes anneae =

Scientific classification
- Kingdom: Animalia
- Phylum: Arthropoda
- Clade: Pancrustacea
- Class: Insecta
- Order: Coleoptera
- Suborder: Polyphaga
- Infraorder: Scarabaeiformia
- Family: Scarabaeidae
- Genus: Proctophanes
- Species: P. anneae

Binomial name
- Proctophanes anneae Stebnicka & Howden, 1995

Species of beetle

Proctophanes anneae is a species of beetle of the family Scarabaeidae. It is found in Australia (Western Australia).

== Description ==
Adults reach a length of about 4.8–5 mm (0.19–0.20 in). They have a shining black body.

== Etymology ==
The species is named for Anne T. Howden, one of the collectors of the species.
