= Barretthydrus stepheni =

Scientific classification
- Kingdom: Animalia
- Phylum: Arthropoda
- Class: Insecta
- Order: Coleoptera
- Suborder: Adephaga
- Family: Dytiscidae
- Genus: Barretthydrus
- Species: B. stepheni

Binomial name
- Barretthydrus stepheni Watts, 1978

Species of diving beetle

Barretthydrus stepheni is a species of freshwater diving beetle in the family, Dytiscidae, first described in 1978 by Chris H.S.Watts. The species has been found in New South Wales.
