= Proctophanes scrubensis =

Scientific classification
- Kingdom: Animalia
- Phylum: Arthropoda
- Clade: Pancrustacea
- Class: Insecta
- Order: Coleoptera
- Suborder: Polyphaga
- Infraorder: Scarabaeiformia
- Family: Scarabaeidae
- Genus: Proctophanes
- Species: P. scrubensis

Binomial name
- Proctophanes scrubensis Stebnicka & Howden, 1995

Species of beetle

Proctophanes scrubensis is a species of beetle of the family Scarabaeidae. It is found in Australia (Queensland).

== Description ==
Adults reach a length of about 2.8–3.2 mm (0.11–0.13 in). They have a shining dark castaneous body, with part of the head, the elytra and legs somewhat lighter.
