= Proctophanes =

Scientific classification
- Kingdom: Animalia
- Phylum: Arthropoda
- Clade: Pancrustacea
- Class: Insecta
- Order: Coleoptera
- Suborder: Polyphaga
- Infraorder: Scarabaeiformia
- Family: Scarabaeidae
- Subfamily: Aphodiinae
- Tribe: Aphodiini
- Genus: Proctophanes; Harold, 1861

Synonyms
- Proctammodes Blackburn, 1892

Genus of beetles

Proctophanes is a genus of beetles of the family Scarabaeidae.

== Species ==
- Proctophanes anneae Stebnicka & Howden, 1995
- Proctophanes caldwellensis Stebnicka & Howden, 1995
- Proctophanes distinguendus (Schmidt, 1910)
- Proctophanes heterodoxus (Lea, 1923)
- Proctophanes metasternalis (Lea, 1923)
- Proctophanes minor (Blackburn, 1897)
- Proctophanes scrubensis Stebnicka & Howden, 1995
- Proctophanes sculptus (Hope, 1846)
