= Rhyparida suturalis =

Scientific classification
- Kingdom: Animalia
- Phylum: Arthropoda
- Clade: Pancrustacea
- Class: Insecta
- Order: Coleoptera
- Suborder: Polyphaga
- Infraorder: Cucujiformia
- Family: Chrysomelidae
- Genus: Rhyparida
- Species: R. suturalis

Binomial name
- Rhyparida suturalis Jacoby, 1894

Species of beetles

Rhyparida suturalis is a species of beetle in the leaf beetle family (Chrysomelidae) native to the Tanimbar Islands in Indonesia. The scientific name of the species was published in 1894 by Martin Jacoby.

== Description ==
It has fulvous, head and thorax closely and strongly punctured, elytra strongly punctate-striate, the sutural and lateral margins piceous.
