= Tesarius mcclayi =

Scientific classification
- Kingdom: Animalia
- Phylum: Arthropoda
- Clade: Pancrustacea
- Class: Insecta
- Order: Coleoptera
- Suborder: Polyphaga
- Infraorder: Scarabaeiformia
- Family: Scarabaeidae
- Genus: Tesarius
- Species: T. mcclayi

Binomial name
- Tesarius mcclayi (Cartwright, 1955)

Synonyms
- Psammodius mcclayi Cartwright, 1955

Species of beetle

Tesarius mcclayi is a species of aphodiine dung beetle in the family Scarabaeidae. It is found in the United States (California) and has been introduced to Great Britain.
