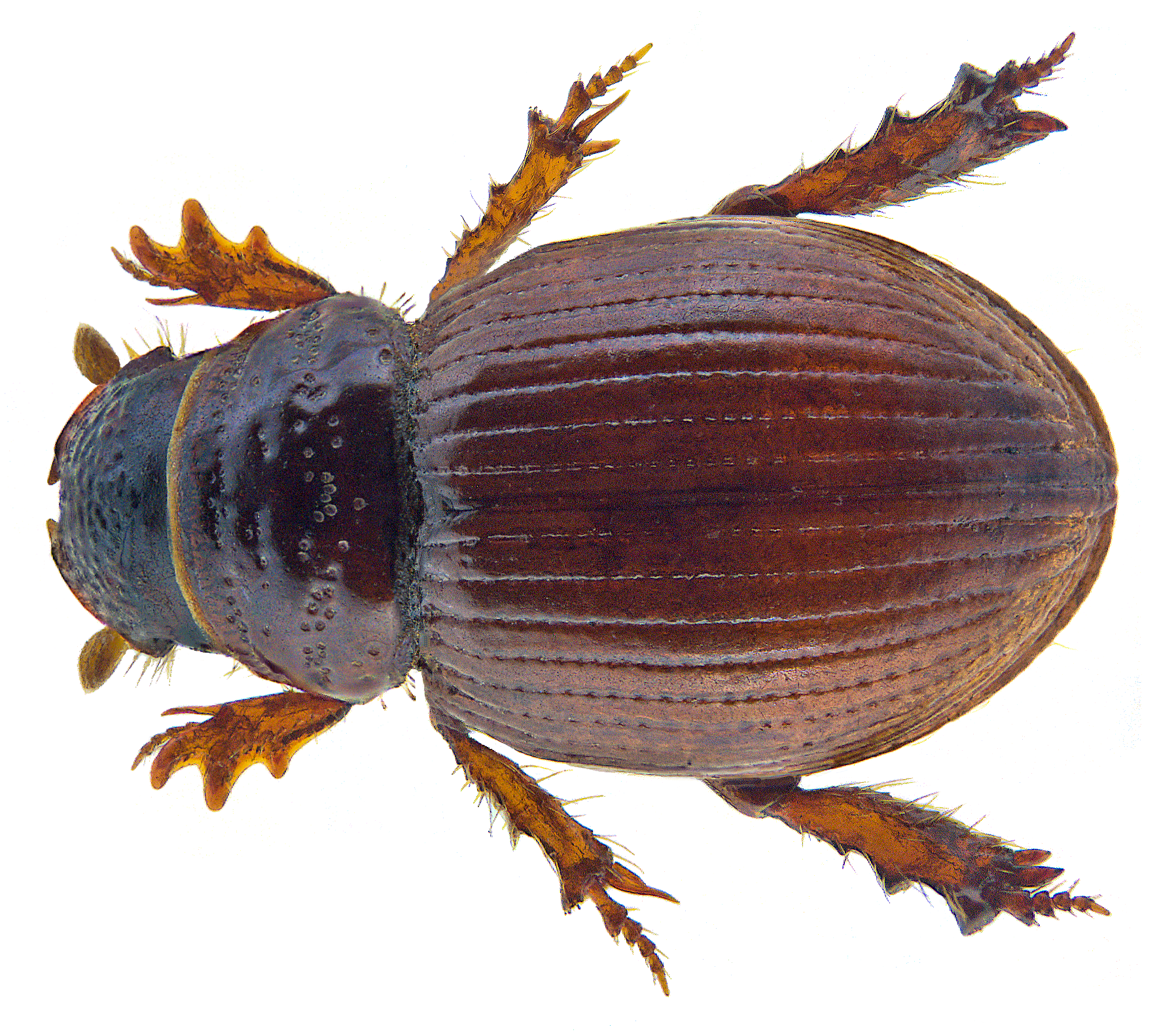

Scientific classification
- Kingdom: Animalia
- Phylum: Arthropoda
- Clade: Pancrustacea
- Class: Insecta
- Order: Coleoptera
- Suborder: Polyphaga
- Infraorder: Scarabaeiformia
- Family: Scarabaeidae
- Genus: Tesarius
- Species: T. caelatus

Binomial name
- Tesarius caelatus (Leconte, 1857)

Synonyms
- Aegialia caelata LeConte, 1857

= Tesarius caelatus =

Species of beetle

Tesarius caelatus is a species of aphodiine dung beetle in the family Scarabaeidae. It is found in Canada (British Columbia), the United States (California, Oregon) and in Chile.
