= Rhyparida dimidiata =

Scientific classification
- Kingdom: Animalia
- Phylum: Arthropoda
- Clade: Pancrustacea
- Class: Insecta
- Order: Coleoptera
- Suborder: Polyphaga
- Infraorder: Cucujiformia
- Family: Chrysomelidae
- Genus: Rhyparida
- Species: R. dimidiata

Binomial name
- Rhyparida dimidiata Baly, 1861

Species of beetles

Rhyparida dimidiata is a species of beetle in the leaf beetle family (Chrysomelidae). It is endemic to Australia. The scientific name of the species was published in 1861 by Joseph Sugar Baly, who described it from Moreton Bay in Queensland.

== Description ==
Rhyparida dimidiata adults are 6–7 mm long, brown coloured with straight side and often shelter on or under the bark of Moreton Bay ash or blue gum.
