= Rhyparida apicalis =

Scientific classification
- Kingdom: Animalia
- Phylum: Arthropoda
- Clade: Pancrustacea
- Class: Insecta
- Order: Coleoptera
- Suborder: Polyphaga
- Infraorder: Cucujiformia
- Family: Chrysomelidae
- Genus: Rhyparida
- Species: R. apicalis

Binomial name
- Rhyparida apicalis Jacoby, 1884

Species of beetles

Rhyparida apicalis is a species of beetle in the leaf beetle family (Chrysomelidae) native to Australia. The scientific name of the species was published in 1884 by Martin Jacoby, who first described it from Somerset, Queensland, a costal locality on the Cape York Peninsula. It was later reported from other localities in Queensland as well as in the Northern Territory and Western Australia.
