= Rhyparida fulvicornis =

Scientific classification
- Kingdom: Animalia
- Phylum: Arthropoda
- Clade: Pancrustacea
- Class: Insecta
- Order: Coleoptera
- Suborder: Polyphaga
- Infraorder: Cucujiformia
- Family: Chrysomelidae
- Genus: Rhyparida
- Species: R. fulvicornis

Binomial name
- Rhyparida fulvicornis Jacoby, 1894

Species of beetles

Rhyparida fulvicornis is a species of beetle in the leaf beetle family (Chrysomelidae). It is recorded only from Bacan, an island in the Maluku Islands of Indonesia. The scientific name of the species was published in 1894 by Martin Jacoby.
