= Rhyparida sangirensis =

Scientific classification
- Kingdom: Animalia
- Phylum: Arthropoda
- Clade: Pancrustacea
- Class: Insecta
- Order: Coleoptera
- Suborder: Polyphaga
- Infraorder: Cucujiformia
- Family: Chrysomelidae
- Genus: Rhyparida
- Species: R. sangirensis

Binomial name
- Rhyparida sangirensis Jacoby, 1894

Species of beetles

Rhyparida sangirensis is a species of beetle in the leaf beetle family (Chrysomelidae) native to the Sangir Islands in Indonesia. The scientific name of the species was published in 1894 by Martin Jacoby.

Broadly ovate, fulvous, head and thorax brownish, very closely punctured, elytra punctate-sulcate, the interstices convex, antennae as long as the body.
