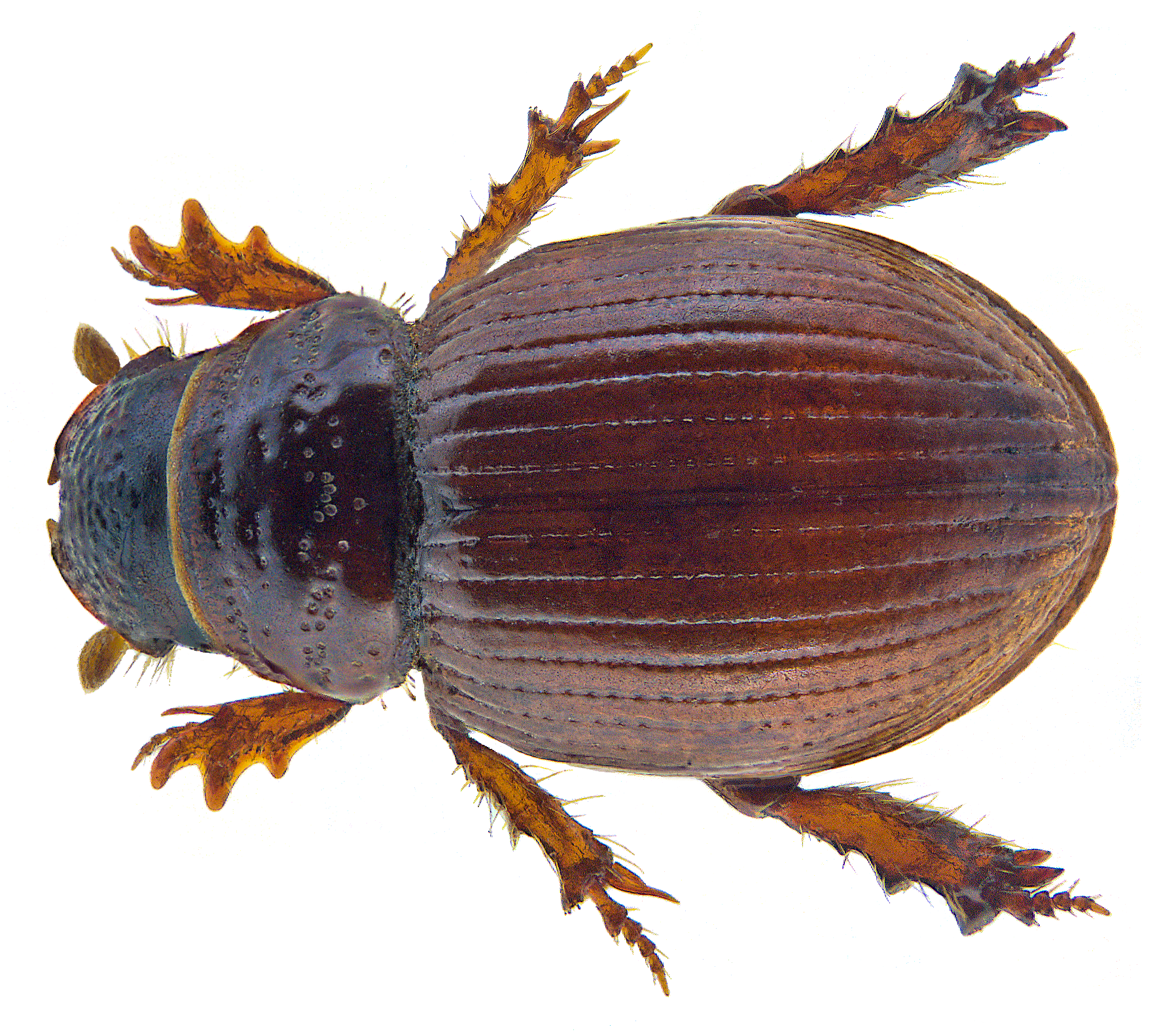
- Tesarius caelatus

Scientific classification
- Kingdom: Animalia
- Phylum: Arthropoda
- Clade: Pancrustacea
- Class: Insecta
- Order: Coleoptera
- Suborder: Polyphaga
- Infraorder: Scarabaeiformia
- Family: Scarabaeidae
- Tribe: Psammodiini
- Genus: Tesarius; Rakovic, 1981

= Tesarius =

Genus of beetles

Tesarius is a genus of aphodiine dung beetles in the family Scarabaeidae. There are about five described species in Tesarius.

== Species ==
These five species belong to the genus Tesarius:

- Tesarius caelatus (Leconte, 1857)
- Tesarius doyeni (Cartwright, 1977)
- Tesarius mcclayi (Cartwright, 1955)
- Tesarius oregonensis (Cartwright, 1955)
- Tesarius sulcipennis (Lea, 1904)
