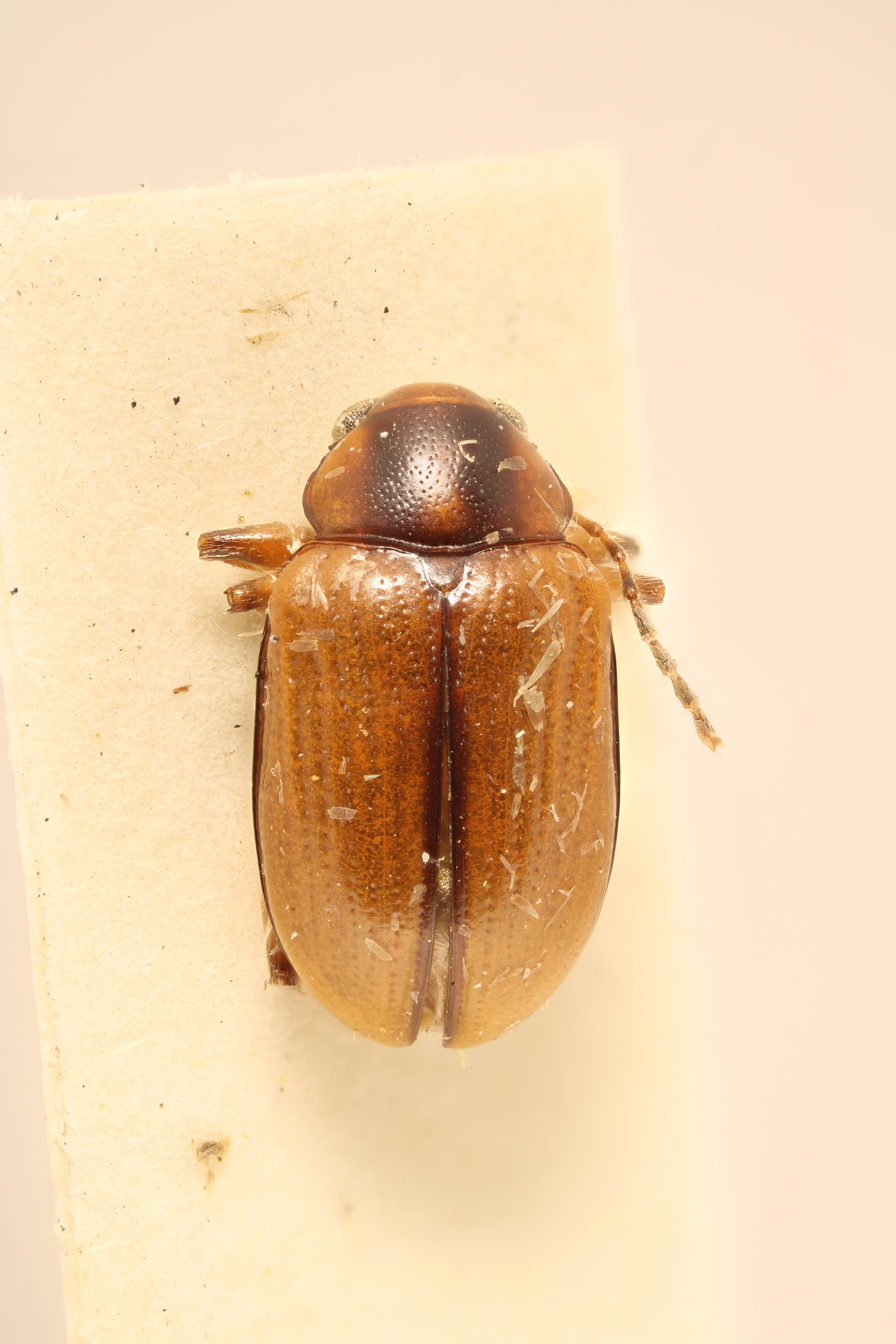
- Rhyparidiella buxtoni, syntype

Scientific classification
- Kingdom: Animalia
- Phylum: Arthropoda
- Clade: Pancrustacea
- Class: Insecta
- Order: Coleoptera
- Suborder: Polyphaga
- Infraorder: Cucujiformia
- Family: Chrysomelidae
- Subfamily: Eumolpinae
- Tribe: Typophorini
- Genus: Rhyparidella; Gressitt, 1969

Type species
- Nodostoma sobrina Bryant, 1950

= Rhyparidella =

Genus of leaf beetles

Rhyparidella is a genus of leaf beetles in the subfamily Eumolpinae. It is distributed in New Guinea, New Britain, Vanuatu and the Solomon Islands. It resembles the genus Rhyparida, but differs from it by having smaller eyes, lacking a "Y"-shaped suture on the frontoclypeus (a combined frons and clypeus, making up part of the face), generally having a small tooth on the underside of each femur on the legs, and being uniformly small-sized.

== Species ==
- Rhyparidella arachi (Gressitt, 1964) – Papua New Guinea (East Sepik)
- Rhyparidella aviceps Gressitt, 1969 – Western New Guinea: West Papua (Fakfak, Manokwari)
- Rhyparidella bicolor Gressitt, 1969 – Western New Guinea: Central Papua (Dogiyai, Paniai)
- Rhyparidella buxtoni (Bryant, 1936) – Vanuatu
- Rhyparidella cacaona (Gressitt, 1966) – New Britain (Gazelle Peninsula, Willaumez Peninsula)
- Rhyparidella casuarinae (Gressitt, 1964) – Papua New Guinea (Eastern Highlands, Western Highlands, Chimbu)
- Rhyparidella cobaltina Gressitt, 1969 – Papua New Guinea (Central)
- Rhyparidella corpulenta Gressitt, 1969 – Woodlark
- Rhyparidella fakfaka Gressitt, 1969 – Western New Guinea: West Papua (Fakfak)
- Rhyparidella fordi Gressitt, 1969 – Papua New Guinea (Morobe, Southern Highlands, Eastern Highlands, Jiwaka)
- Rhyparidella fulva Medvedev, 2009 – Western New Guinea: West Papua (Arfak Mountains)
- Rhyparidella hibisci (Gressitt, 1964) – Papua New Guinea (Gulf)
- Rhyparidella nigripennis Medvedev, 2009 – Western New Guinea: Highland Papua (Jayawijaya)
- Rhyparidella ovipennis Medvedev, 2009 – Western New Guinea: Highland Papua (Jayawijaya)
- Rhyparidella quadripustulata (Jacoby, 1884) – Biak, Yapen
- Rhyparidella riedeli Medvedev, 2009 – Western New Guinea: West Papua (Arfak Mountains)
- Rhyparidella rufocapitis Medvedev, 2009 – Western New Guinea: West Papua (Arfak Mountains)
- Rhyparidella rufometallica Gressitt, 1969 – Papua New Guinea (Enga, Sandaun, Madang)
- Rhyparidella sewana Gressitt, 1969 – Normanby Island
- Rhyparidella sobrina (Bryant, 1950) – Western New Guinea: Papua
- Rhyparidella suturalis Medvedev, 2009 – Western New Guinea: Highland Papua (Jayawijaya)
- Rhyparidella wauensis Gressitt, 1969 – Papua New Guinea (Morobe)
- Rhyparidella weisei Medvedev, 2009 – Western New Guinea
