= Heteronyx irrasus =

Scientific classification
- Kingdom: Animalia
- Phylum: Arthropoda
- Clade: Pancrustacea
- Class: Insecta
- Order: Coleoptera
- Suborder: Polyphaga
- Infraorder: Scarabaeiformia
- Family: Scarabaeidae
- Genus: Heteronyx
- Species: H. irrasus

Binomial name
- Heteronyx irrasus Lea, 1926

Species of beetle

Heteronyx irrasus is a species of beetle of the family Scarabaeidae. It is found in Australia (Northern Territory).

== Description ==
Adults reach a length of about 6.5–8 mm (0.26–0.31 in). The pygidium and apical margins of the elytra are dull, the former clothed with short setae and sparse long ones.
