= Podotenus insignior =

Scientific classification
- Kingdom: Animalia
- Phylum: Arthropoda
- Clade: Pancrustacea
- Class: Insecta
- Order: Coleoptera
- Suborder: Polyphaga
- Infraorder: Scarabaeiformia
- Family: Scarabaeidae
- Genus: Podotenus
- Species: P. insignior

Binomial name
- Podotenus insignior (Blackburn, 1904)

Synonyms
- Aphodius insignior Blackburn, 1904; Trogaphodius tuberculatus Balthasar, 1965

Species of beetle

Podotenus insignior is a species of beetle of the family Scarabaeidae. It is found in Australia (Western Australia).

== Description ==
Adults reach a length of about 5 mm (0.20 in). They have an elongate, moderately convex, feebly shiny, blackish body with yellowish hairs. The sides of the pronotum and elytra are blackish tuberculated and the legs are testaceous.
