= Podotenus tennantensis =

Scientific classification
- Kingdom: Animalia
- Phylum: Arthropoda
- Clade: Pancrustacea
- Class: Insecta
- Order: Coleoptera
- Suborder: Polyphaga
- Infraorder: Scarabaeiformia
- Family: Scarabaeidae
- Genus: Podotenus
- Species: P. tennantensis

Binomial name
- Podotenus tennantensis Stebnicka & Howden, 1995

Species of beetle

Podotenus tennantensis is a species of beetle of the family Scarabaeidae. It is found in Australia (Northern Territory).

== Description ==
Adults reach a length of about 6.8–7 mm (0.27–0.28 in). They have a subopaque, rusty-brown body, with the sides of the pronotum and ventral surface yellowish, and with pale setae.
