= Candezeollus =

Scientific classification
- Kingdom: Animalia
- Phylum: Arthropoda
- Clade: Pancrustacea
- Class: Insecta
- Order: Coleoptera
- Suborder: Polyphaga
- Infraorder: Scarabaeiformia
- Family: Scarabaeidae
- Subfamily: Aphodiinae
- Tribe: Aphodiini
- Genus: Candezeollus; Stebnicka & Howden, 1995

Genus of beetles

Candezeollus is a genus of beetles of the family Scarabaeidae.

== Species ==
- Candezeollus bicrenulatus (Lea, 1923)
- Candezeollus candezei (Harold, 1868)
- Candezeollus pseudocandezei Stebnicka & Howden, 1995
