= Liparetrus vestitus =

Scientific classification
- Kingdom: Animalia
- Phylum: Arthropoda
- Clade: Pancrustacea
- Class: Insecta
- Order: Coleoptera
- Suborder: Polyphaga
- Infraorder: Scarabaeiformia
- Family: Scarabaeidae
- Genus: Liparetrus
- Species: L. vestitus

Binomial name
- Liparetrus vestitus Blanchard, 1850

Synonyms
- Liparetrus nigroumbratus Blackburn, 1888; Liparetrus pruinosus Burmeister, 1855; Liparetrus sedani Blackburn, 1888

Species of beetle

Liparetrus vestitus is a species of beetle of the family Scarabaeidae. It is found in Australia (South Australia, Tasmania, Victoria, New South Wales, Australian Capital Territory).

== Taxonomy ==
This species belongs to the luridipennis species group. The defining characters of this group include setae on the disc of the pronotum.

== Description ==
Adults reach a length of about 6.5–9 mm (0.26–0.35 in). The head, pronotum, scutellum, abdomen and ventral surface are black, while the elytra are reddish brown. The legs are reddish brown and the antennae are also reddish brown, but with a darker club. The head and pronotum are shining, while the elytra are dull.

== Subspecies ==
- Liparetrus vestitus vestitus (South Australia, Tasmania, Victoria, New South Wales, Australian Capital Territory)
- Liparetrus vestitus sedani Blackburn, 1888 (South Australia)
