= Kyogle (beetle) =

Scientific classification
- Kingdom: Animalia
- Phylum: Arthropoda
- Clade: Pancrustacea
- Class: Insecta
- Order: Coleoptera
- Suborder: Polyphaga
- Infraorder: Staphyliniformia
- Family: Staphylinidae
- Genus: Kyogle; Chandler, 2001

Type species
- Kyogle bryophilus

Insect genus

Kyogle is a genus of insects in the family Staphylinidae, first described by Donald S. Chandler in 2001. The genus is found only in Australia, in New South Wales, South Australia, Victoria, Queensland and Tasmania.

There are four species:

- Kyogle bryophilus (Lea, 1911)
- Kyogle conicicornis (Lea, 1911)
- Kyogle sexfoveatus (Lea, 1911)
- Kyogle villosus (Lea, 1910)
