= Liparetrus gracilipes =

Scientific classification
- Kingdom: Animalia
- Phylum: Arthropoda
- Clade: Pancrustacea
- Class: Insecta
- Order: Coleoptera
- Suborder: Polyphaga
- Infraorder: Scarabaeiformia
- Family: Scarabaeidae
- Genus: Liparetrus
- Species: L. gracilipes

Binomial name
- Liparetrus gracilipes Blackburn, 1888

Synonyms
- Liparetrus tuberculatus Lea, 1895

Species of beetle

Liparetrus gracilipes is a species of beetle of the family Scarabaeidae. It is found in Australia (Victoria, New South Wales, South Australia).

== Taxonomy ==
This species belongs to the gracilipes species group. The defining characters of this group include the absence of setae on the discs of the pronotum and elytra, while the pronotum is either without setae on the anterior margin or with only a few setae on each side.

== Description ==
Adults reach a length of about 7–10 mm (0.28–0.39 in). The head and pronotum are black, while the rest of the body and legs are dark reddish brown to black. The elytra are sometimes iridescent. The antennae are yellowish brown.
