= Liparetrus striatus =

Scientific classification
- Kingdom: Animalia
- Phylum: Arthropoda
- Clade: Pancrustacea
- Class: Insecta
- Order: Coleoptera
- Suborder: Polyphaga
- Infraorder: Scarabaeiformia
- Family: Scarabaeidae
- Genus: Liparetrus
- Species: L. striatus

Binomial name
- Liparetrus striatus Blanchard, 1850

Synonyms
- Liparetrus ovatus MacLeay, 1886; Liparetrus glabratus Burmeister, 1855

Species of beetle

Liparetrus striatus is a species of beetle of the family Scarabaeidae. It is found in Australia (Western Australia, South Australia, New South Wales).

== Taxonomy ==
This species belongs to the striatus species group. The defining characters of this group include the absence of setae on the disc of the pronotum and scales or flattened, adpressed setae on the propygidium and usually also the pygidium.

== Description ==
Adults reach a length of about 6.7–9.2 mm (0.26–0.36 in). The head, pronotum, scutellum, abdomen and ventral surface are black and the legs piceous. The elytra are pale yellowish brown with black margins. The antennae are reddish brown with a black club.
