= Arthur Mills Lea =

Australian entomologist (1868–1932)

Arthur Mills Lea (10 August 1868 – 29 February 1932) was an Australian entomologist.

Lea was born in Surry Hills, New South Wales, the second son of Thomas Lea, from Bristol, England, and his wife Cornelia, née Dumbrell, of Sydney. As a child, Lea was interested in insects and studied them in his spare time. He worked for a chartered accountant firm in Sydney for a while, then became an assistant entomologist for the minister of Agriculture at Sydney in 1891. In 1895 he became government entomologist in Western Australia. Then in 1899 he was appointed government entomologist in Tasmania, where he succeeded in controlling the codling moth.

From 1912 to 1924 Lea taught at University of Adelaide; he specialised in the study of beetles. From 1924 he took a 12-month appointment with the government of Fiji to investigate the Levuana moth, a pest attacking copra crops. Lea searched for a fly parasite, eventually finding one in Malaya, of the family Tachinidae. However, the flies died on transport by ship to Fiji. Later on, the same fly species was introduced to Fiji without Lea getting credit. (see John Douglas Tothill)

Lea also collected specimens in New Caledonia, and when his eyesight began to fail he relied on his assistant, Norman Tindale to make drawings. In all, he described 5,432 new beetle species, and was a fellow of the Linnean Society of New South Wales, of the Royal Society of South Australia and of the Entomological Society of London.

His zoological author abbreviation is Lea.
