= Eulimnichus californicus =

Scientific classification
- Domain: Eukaryota
- Kingdom: Animalia
- Phylum: Arthropoda
- Class: Insecta
- Order: Coleoptera
- Suborder: Polyphaga
- Infraorder: Elateriformia
- Family: Limnichidae
- Genus: Eulimnichus
- Species: E. californicus

Binomial name
- Eulimnichus californicus (Leconte, 1879)

Synonyms
- Limnichus californicus LeConte, 1879

Species of beetle

Eulimnichus californicus is a species of minute marsh-loving beetle in the family Limnichidae. It is found in North America.
