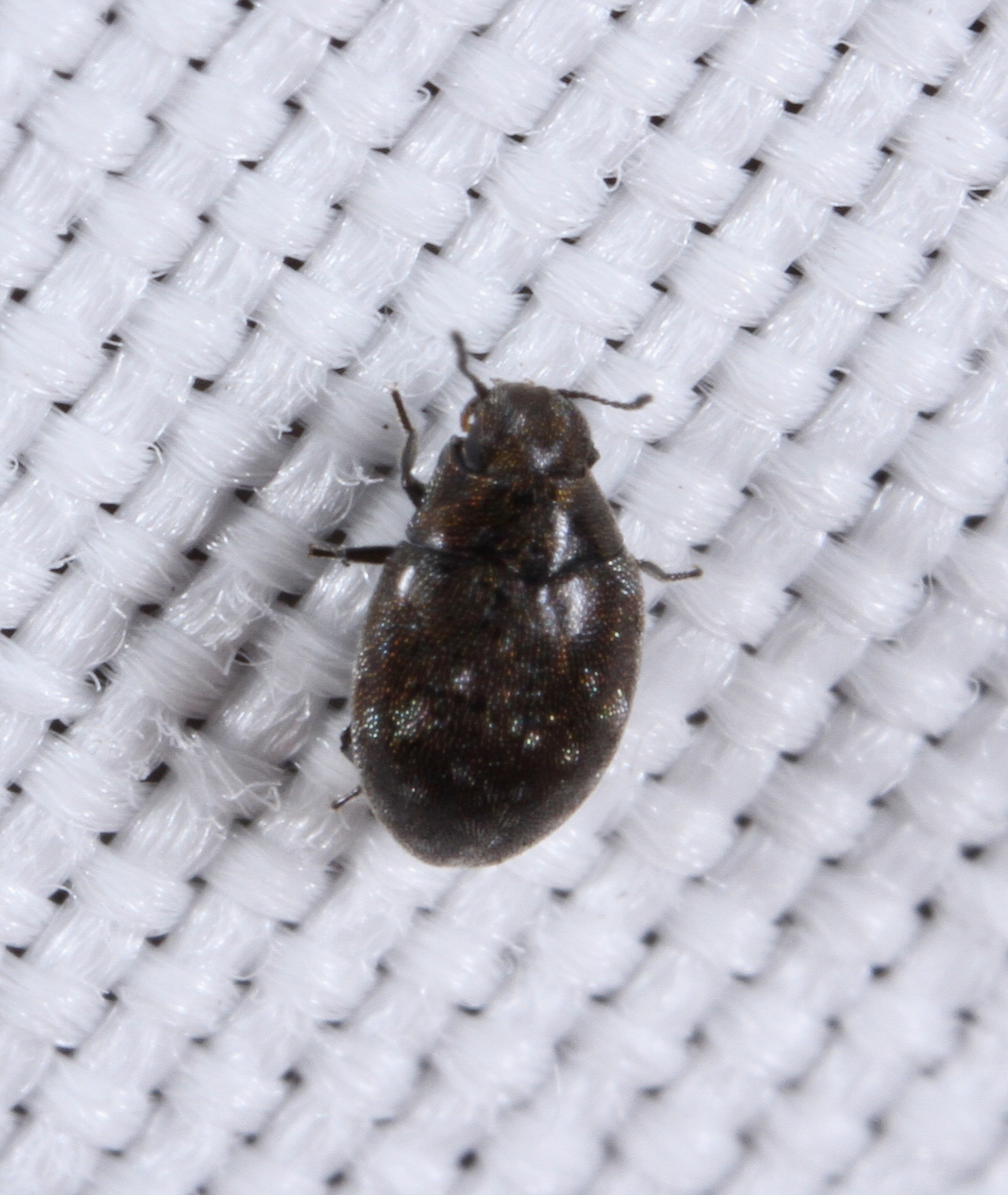
- Eulimnichus ater, Texas

Scientific classification
- Kingdom: Animalia
- Phylum: Arthropoda
- Class: Insecta
- Order: Coleoptera
- Suborder: Polyphaga
- Infraorder: Elateriformia
- Family: Limnichidae
- Subfamily: Limnichinae
- Genus: Eulimnichus; Casey, 1889

= Eulimnichus =

Genus of beetles

Eulimnichus is a genus of minute marsh-loving beetles in the family Limnichidae. There are more than 20 described species in Eulimnichus, found in North, Central, and South America.

== Species ==
These 28 species belong to the genus Eulimnichus:

- Eulimnichus acutus Wooldridge, 1979
- Eulimnichus analis (LeConte, 1879)
- Eulimnichus ater (Leconte, 1854)
- Eulimnichus californicus (Leconte, 1879)
- Eulimnichus coheni Wooldridge, 1979
- Eulimnichus corrineae Wooldridge, 1979
- Eulimnichus epistemus Sharp, 1902
- Eulimnichus evanescens Casey, 1912
- Eulimnichus expeditus Wooldridge, 1984
- Eulimnichus impostus Wooldridge, 1978
- Eulimnichus improcerus Wooldridge, 1979
- Eulimnichus incultus Wooldridge, 1979
- Eulimnichus langleyae Wooldridge, 1979
- Eulimnichus montanus (LeConte, 1879)
- Eulimnichus nitidulus (LeConte, 1854)
- Eulimnichus obscurus (LeConte, 1854)
- Eulimnichus optatus Sharp, 1902
- Eulimnichus pellucidus Wooldridge, 1979
- Eulimnichus perpolitus (Casey, 1889)
- Eulimnichus plebius Sharp, 1902
- Eulimnichus rugulosus Wooldridge, 1979
- Eulimnichus rusticus Wooldridge, 1979
- Eulimnichus sharpi Wooldridge, 1979
- Eulimnichus sordidus Sharp, 1902
- Eulimnichus spangleri Wooldridge, 1979
- Eulimnichus subitus Wooldridge, 1979
- Eulimnichus sublaevis Sharp, 1902
- Eulimnichus visendus Wooldridge, 1979
