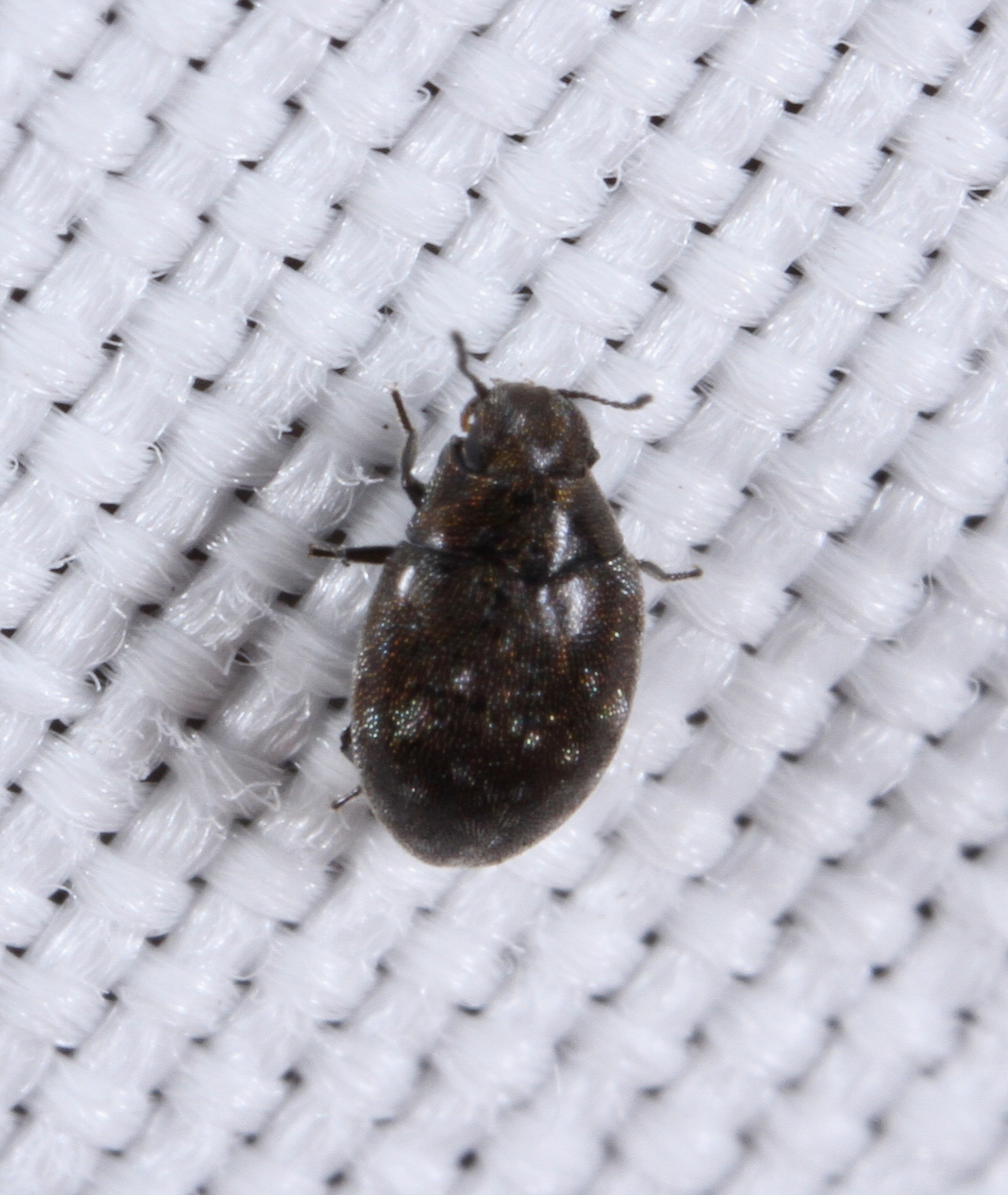
- Eulimnichus ater, Texas

Scientific classification
- Kingdom: Animalia
- Phylum: Arthropoda
- Class: Insecta
- Order: Coleoptera
- Suborder: Polyphaga
- Infraorder: Elateriformia
- Family: Limnichidae
- Genus: Eulimnichus
- Species: E. ater

Binomial name
- Eulimnichus ater (Leconte, 1854)

Synonyms
- Eulimnichus guatemalicus Sharp, 1902; Limnichoderus oblongus Pic, 1922; Limnichus ater LeConte, 1854; Limnichus sculpticeps Casey, 1912

= Eulimnichus ater =

Species of beetle

Eulimnichus ater is a species of minute marsh-loving beetle in the family Limnichidae. It is found in the Caribbean Sea, Central America, North America, and South America.
