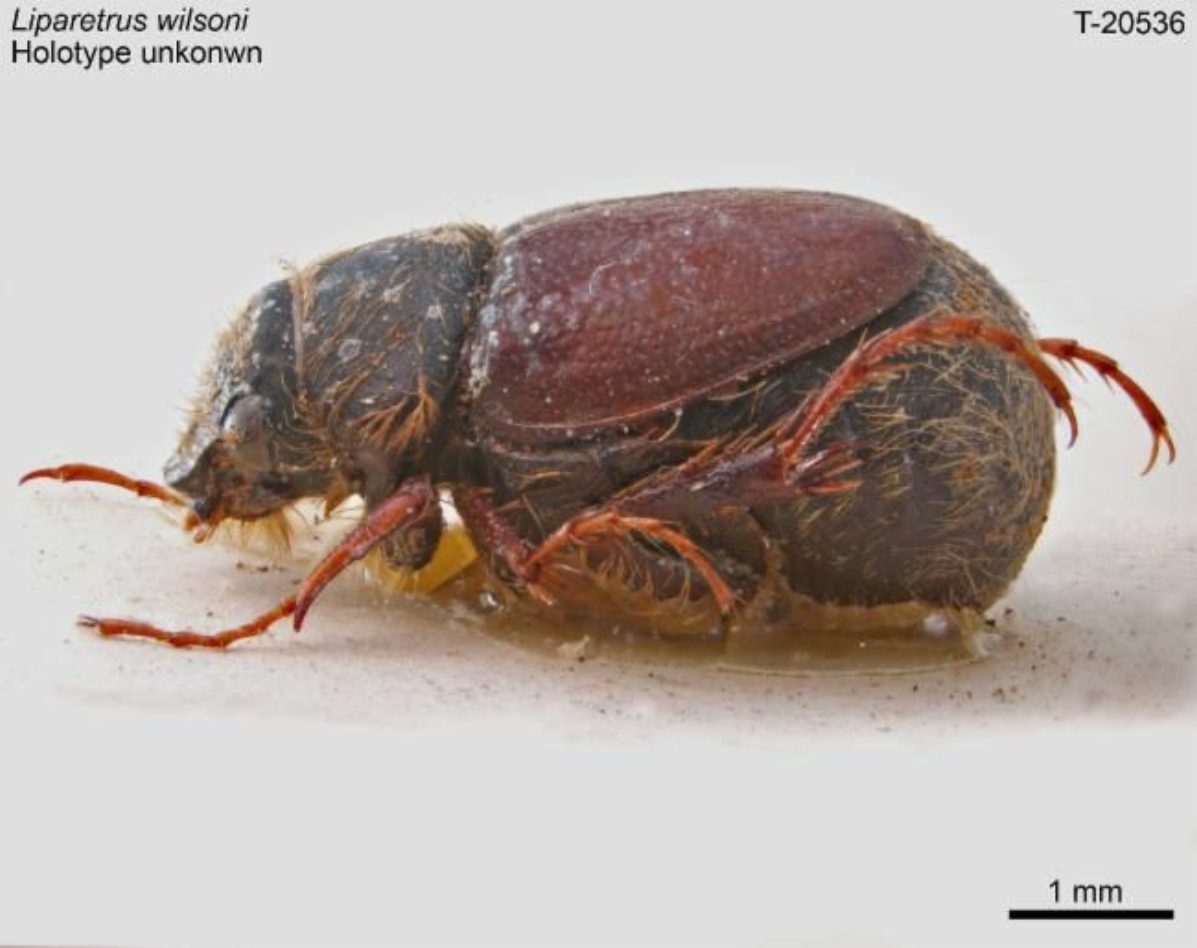

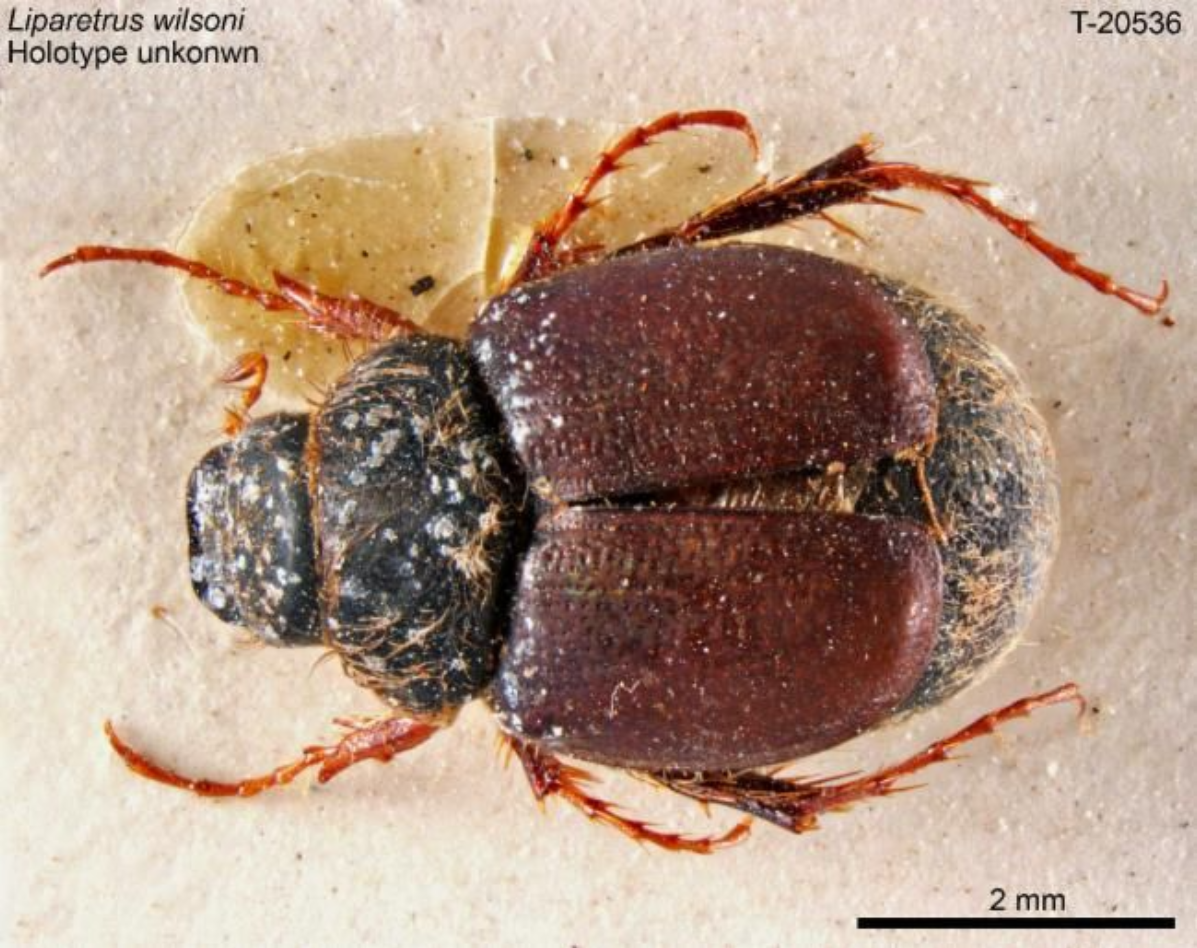

Scientific classification
- Kingdom: Animalia
- Phylum: Arthropoda
- Clade: Pancrustacea
- Class: Insecta
- Order: Coleoptera
- Suborder: Polyphaga
- Infraorder: Scarabaeiformia
- Family: Scarabaeidae
- Genus: Liparetrus
- Species: L. wilsoni

Binomial name
- Liparetrus wilsoni Britton, 1980

= Liparetrus wilsoni =

Species of beetle

Liparetrus wilsoni is a species of beetle of the family Scarabaeidae. It is found in Australia (Victoria).

== Taxonomy ==
This species belongs to the dixoni species group. The defining characters of this group include the covering of broad scales on the clypeus, frons, pronotum and abdomen.

== Description ==
Adults reach a length of about 5.5 mm (0.22 in). The body is black with dark brown elytra and mostly reddish brown legs. The antennae are yellowish brown.
