= Liparetrus ventralis =

Scientific classification
- Kingdom: Animalia
- Phylum: Arthropoda
- Clade: Pancrustacea
- Class: Insecta
- Order: Coleoptera
- Suborder: Polyphaga
- Infraorder: Scarabaeiformia
- Family: Scarabaeidae
- Genus: Liparetrus
- Species: L. ventralis

Binomial name
- Liparetrus ventralis Blackburn, 1905

Species of beetle

Liparetrus ventralis is a species of beetle of the family Scarabaeidae. It is found in Australia (Queensland).

== Taxonomy ==
This species belongs to the discipennis species group. The defining characters of this group include the presence of long setae on the disc of the elytra (at least towards the base).

== Description ==
Adults reach a length of about 6 mm (0.24 in). They are similar to Liparetrus discipennis, but the setae are pale yellow and the antennal club is dark only at the apex.
