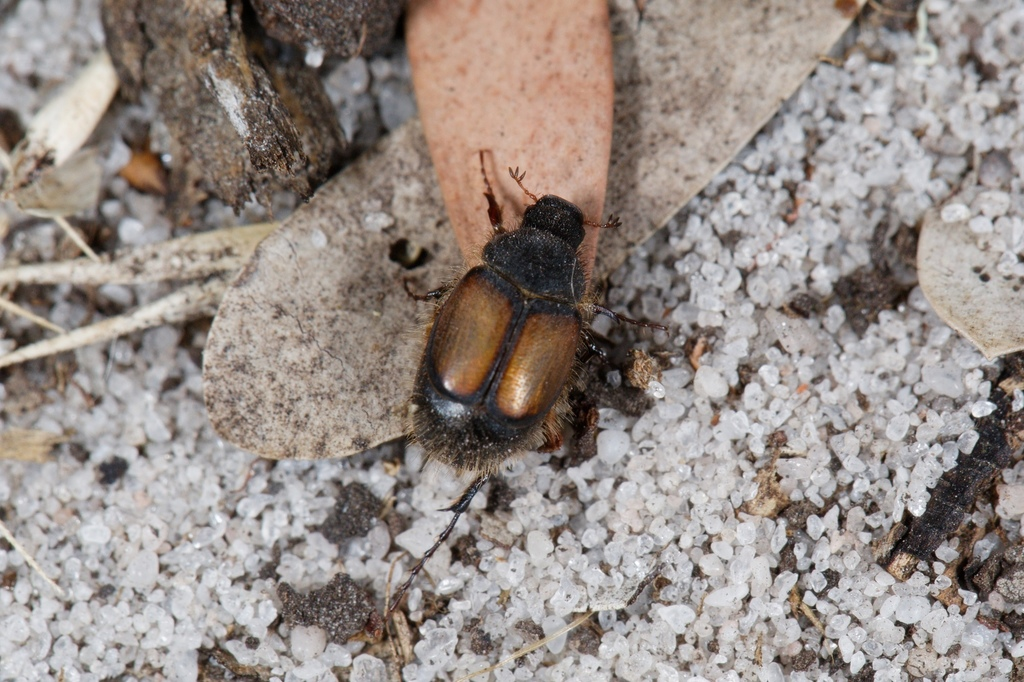

Scientific classification
- Kingdom: Animalia
- Phylum: Arthropoda
- Clade: Pancrustacea
- Class: Insecta
- Order: Coleoptera
- Suborder: Polyphaga
- Infraorder: Scarabaeiformia
- Family: Scarabaeidae
- Genus: Liparetrus
- Species: L. discipennis

Binomial name
- Liparetrus discipennis Guérin-Méneville, 1830

Synonyms
- Liparetrus puncticeps Lea, 1917; Liparetrus assimilis MacLeay, 1886; Liparetrus canescens MacLeay, 1886; Liparetrus montanus MacLeay, 1886

= Liparetrus discipennis =

Species of beetle

Liparetrus discipennis is a species of beetle of the family Scarabaeidae. It is found in Australia (New South Wales, South Australia, Victoria, Australian Capital Territory, Queensland, Tasmania).

== Taxonomy ==
This species belongs to the discipennis species group. The defining characters of this group include the presence of long setae on the disc of the elytra (at least towards the base).

== Description ==
Adults reach a length of about 6–8 mm (0.24–0.31 in). The head, pronotum, abdomen and ventral surface are black, while the elytra are pale yellowish brown on the disc and have black margins. The antennae are yellowish brown with a brown club. The legs are mostly dark brown.
