= Liparetrus albosetosus =

Scientific classification
- Kingdom: Animalia
- Phylum: Arthropoda
- Clade: Pancrustacea
- Class: Insecta
- Order: Coleoptera
- Suborder: Polyphaga
- Infraorder: Scarabaeiformia
- Family: Scarabaeidae
- Genus: Liparetrus
- Species: L. albosetosus

Binomial name
- Liparetrus albosetosus Britton, 1980

Species of beetle

Liparetrus albosetosus is a species of beetle of the family Scarabaeidae. It is found in Australia (Western Australia).

== Taxonomy ==
This species belongs to the fulvohirtus species group. The defining characters of this group include the presence of setae on the discs of the pronotum and elytra.

== Description ==
Adults reach a length of about 11.5 mm (0.45 in). They are similar to Liparetrus fulvohirtus, but may be distinguished by the less dense setiferous punctures on the head and pronotum, the nearly white setae on the body, and by the shape of the aedeagus.
