= Liparetrus fulvohirtus =

Scientific classification
- Kingdom: Animalia
- Phylum: Arthropoda
- Clade: Pancrustacea
- Class: Insecta
- Order: Coleoptera
- Suborder: Polyphaga
- Infraorder: Scarabaeiformia
- Family: Scarabaeidae
- Genus: Liparetrus
- Species: L. fulvohirtus

Binomial name
- Liparetrus fulvohirtus MacLeay, 1871

Synonyms
- Liparetrus adelaidae Blackburn, 1892; Liparetrus comatus MacLeay, 1886; Liparetrus mitchelli MacLeay, 1886; Liparetrus villosicollis MacLeay, 1886; Liparetrus flavopilosus MacLeay, 1871; Liparetrus pilosus MacLeay, 1871; Liparetrus rufiventris MacLeay, 1871

Species of beetle

Liparetrus fulvohirtus is a species of beetle of the family Scarabaeidae. It is found in Australia (Queensland, South Australia, New South Wales, Victoria).

== Taxonomy ==
This species belongs to the fulvohirtus species group. The defining characters of this group include the presence of setae on the discs of the pronotum and elytra.

== Description ==
Adults reach a length of about 7–11 mm (0.28–0.43 in). They have a black body, with reddish brown elytra with a black base. The colour of the setae on the disc of the pronotum varies from dark brown to orange to pale yellowish white.
