= Liparetrus pallidulus =

Scientific classification
- Kingdom: Animalia
- Phylum: Arthropoda
- Clade: Pancrustacea
- Class: Insecta
- Order: Coleoptera
- Suborder: Polyphaga
- Infraorder: Scarabaeiformia
- Family: Scarabaeidae
- Genus: Liparetrus
- Species: L. pallidulus

Binomial name
- Liparetrus pallidulus (MacLeay, 1888)

Synonyms
- Scitala pallidula MacLeay, 1888; Liparetrus bilobus Lea, 1924

Species of beetle

Liparetrus pallidulus is a species of beetle of the family Scarabaeidae. It is found in Australia (Western Australia, Northern Territory).

== Taxonomy ==
This species belongs to the flavus species group. The defining characters of this group include the absence of obvious setae on the disc of the pronotum, the glabrous or setate (but without scales) propygidium and pygidium, the elongate elytra and the pale yellowish brown colour of the body.

== Description ==
Adults reach a length of about 7–9.5 mm (0.28–0.37 in). They are very similar to Liparetrus luteus, but may be distinguished by the absence of a fringe of short yellowish setae on the posterior margin of the pronotum, the larger body size and the aedeagus.
