= Liparetrus luteus =

Scientific classification
- Kingdom: Animalia
- Phylum: Arthropoda
- Clade: Pancrustacea
- Class: Insecta
- Order: Coleoptera
- Suborder: Polyphaga
- Infraorder: Scarabaeiformia
- Family: Scarabaeidae
- Genus: Liparetrus
- Species: L. luteus

Binomial name
- Liparetrus luteus Britton, 1980

Species of beetle

Liparetrus luteus is a species of beetle of the family Scarabaeidae. It is found in Australia (Western Australia, Northern Territory).

== Taxonomy ==
This species belongs to the flavus species group. The defining characters of this group include the absence of obvious setae on the disc of the pronotum, the glabrous or setate (but without scales) propygidium and pygidium, the elongate elytra and the pale yellowish brown colour of the body.

== Description ==
Adults reach a length of about 6.5–7.2 mm (0.26–0.28 in). The anterior margin of the pronotum has a fringe of setae, which is interrupted in the middle and there is also a fringe of short yellowish setae at the posterior margin.
