= Liparetrus villosus =

Scientific classification
- Kingdom: Animalia
- Phylum: Arthropoda
- Clade: Pancrustacea
- Class: Insecta
- Order: Coleoptera
- Suborder: Polyphaga
- Infraorder: Scarabaeiformia
- Family: Scarabaeidae
- Genus: Liparetrus
- Species: L. villosus

Binomial name
- Liparetrus villosus Britton, 1980

Species of beetle

Liparetrus villosus is a species of beetle of the family Scarabaeidae. It is found in Australia (Western Australia).

== Taxonomy ==
This species belongs to the marginipennis species group. The defining characters of this group include the presence of setae on the disc of the pronotum. The elytra normally also have setae on the disc, but these may be absent, in which case there is at least a continuous fringe of setae on the anterior margin.

== Description ==
Adults reach a length of about 10–14 mm (0.39–0.55 in). They are similar to Liparetrus marginipennis, but larger, and with a smaller black area at the base of the elytra, as well as with yellowish setae on the elytra.
