= Liparetrus marginipennis =

Scientific classification
- Kingdom: Animalia
- Phylum: Arthropoda
- Clade: Pancrustacea
- Class: Insecta
- Order: Coleoptera
- Suborder: Polyphaga
- Infraorder: Scarabaeiformia
- Family: Scarabaeidae
- Genus: Liparetrus
- Species: L. marginipennis

Binomial name
- Liparetrus marginipennis Blanchard, 1850

Synonyms
- Liparetrus callosus MacLeay, 1886; Liparetrus nigrohirtus MacLeay, 1886; Liparetrus hirsutus Burmeister, 1855

Species of beetle

Liparetrus marginipennis is a species of beetle of the family Scarabaeidae. It is found in Australia (from southern Queensland through New South Wales to Victoria).

== Taxonomy ==
This species belongs to the marginipennis species group. The defining characters of this group include the presence of setae on the disc of the pronotum. The elytra normally also have setae on the disc, but these may be absent, in which case there is at least a continuous fringe of setae on the anterior margin.

== Description ==
Adults reach a length of about 7–10 mm (0.28–0.39 in). The elytra are reddish brown with the basal area iridescent black.
