= Liparetrus bituberculatus =

Scientific classification
- Kingdom: Animalia
- Phylum: Arthropoda
- Clade: Pancrustacea
- Class: Insecta
- Order: Coleoptera
- Suborder: Polyphaga
- Infraorder: Scarabaeiformia
- Family: Scarabaeidae
- Genus: Liparetrus
- Species: L. bituberculatus

Binomial name
- Liparetrus bituberculatus MacLeay, 1886

Synonyms
- Liparetrus piliceps Lea, 1924; Liparetrus melaleucae Lea, 1917

Species of beetle

Liparetrus bituberculatus is a species of beetle of the family Scarabaeidae. It is found in Australia (South Australia).

== Taxonomy ==
This species belongs to the rufipennis species group. The defining characters of this group include the absence of setae and scales on the disc of the pronotum.

== Description ==
Adults reach a length of about 5–7 mm (0.20–0.28 in). They are similar to Liparetrus tridentatus, but may be distinguished by not having a continuous fringe on the anterior margin of the pronotum, the absence of setae on the disc of the pronotum and the shape of the aedeagus.
