= Liparetrus tridentatus =

Scientific classification
- Kingdom: Animalia
- Phylum: Arthropoda
- Clade: Pancrustacea
- Class: Insecta
- Order: Coleoptera
- Suborder: Polyphaga
- Infraorder: Scarabaeiformia
- Family: Scarabaeidae
- Genus: Liparetrus
- Species: L. tridentatus

Binomial name
- Liparetrus tridentatus MacLeay, 1871

Synonyms
- Liparetrus acutidens MacLeay, 1886

Species of beetle

Liparetrus tridentatus is a species of beetle of the family Scarabaeidae. It is found in Australia (Queensland, New South Wales).

== Taxonomy ==
This species belongs to the capillatus species group. The defining characters of this group include the absence of setae on the disc of the pronotum, although sometimes scales are present.

== Description ==
Adults reach a length of about 5.5–6.8 mm (0.22–0.27 in). The head, pronotum, abdomen and ventral surface are black, while the elytra are yellowish brown, with the base and sometimes also the lateral margins blackish.
