= Liparetrus curtulus =

Scientific classification
- Kingdom: Animalia
- Phylum: Arthropoda
- Clade: Pancrustacea
- Class: Insecta
- Order: Coleoptera
- Suborder: Polyphaga
- Infraorder: Scarabaeiformia
- Family: Scarabaeidae
- Genus: Liparetrus
- Species: L. curtulus

Binomial name
- Liparetrus curtulus Burmeister, 1855

Synonyms
- Liparetrus brunneipennis Blackburn, 1892; Liparetrus ubiquitosus MacLeay, 1886

Species of beetle

Liparetrus curtulus is a species of beetle of the family Scarabaeidae. It is found in Australia (New South Wales, Australian Capital Territory, Victoria).

== Taxonomy ==
This species belongs to the ferrugineus species group.

== Description ==
Adults reach a length of about 5.25–7 mm (0.207–0.276 in). They are very similar to Liparetrus ferrugineus, but may be distinguished by the all black abdomen, the shape of the clypeus of the males, the dark brown legs and the shape of the aedeagus.
