= Liparetrus ferrugineus =

Scientific classification
- Kingdom: Animalia
- Phylum: Arthropoda
- Clade: Pancrustacea
- Class: Insecta
- Order: Coleoptera
- Suborder: Polyphaga
- Infraorder: Scarabaeiformia
- Family: Scarabaeidae
- Genus: Liparetrus
- Species: L. ferrugineus

Binomial name
- Liparetrus ferrugineus Blanchard, 1850

Species of beetle

Liparetrus ferrugineus is a species of beetle of the family Scarabaeidae. It is found in Australia (Victoria, New South Wales, Australian Capital Territory, Queensland).

== Taxonomy ==
This species belongs to the ferrugineus species group.

== Description ==
Adults reach a length of about 5.5–7.5 mm (0.22–0.30 in). The head, pronotum and ventral surface are black, while the elytra are bright reddish brown with a black base. The abdomen is bright reddish brown and also black at the base. The antennae are reddish yellow, with the antennal lamellae brown. The front legs are yellowish brown, while the hind legs are black.
