= Liparetrus ascius =

Scientific classification
- Kingdom: Animalia
- Phylum: Arthropoda
- Clade: Pancrustacea
- Class: Insecta
- Order: Coleoptera
- Suborder: Polyphaga
- Infraorder: Scarabaeiformia
- Family: Scarabaeidae
- Genus: Liparetrus
- Species: L. ascius

Binomial name
- Liparetrus ascius Britton, 1980

Species of beetle

Liparetrus ascius is a species of beetle of the family Scarabaeidae. It is found in Australia (Northern Territory, South Australia, Western Australia, Queensland).

== Taxonomy ==
This species belongs to the flavus species group. The defining characters of this group include the absence of obvious setae on the disc of the pronotum, the glabrous or setate (but without scales) propygidium and pygidium, the elongate elytra and the pale yellowish brown colour of the body.

== Description ==
Adults reach a length of about 6.5–8 mm (0.26–0.31 in). They are very similar to Liparetrus flavidus, but the propygidium and pygidium are only sparsely covered with short setae. The aedeagus has a similar form, but is broader.
