= Liparetrus abnormalis =

Scientific classification
- Kingdom: Animalia
- Phylum: Arthropoda
- Clade: Pancrustacea
- Class: Insecta
- Order: Coleoptera
- Suborder: Polyphaga
- Infraorder: Scarabaeiformia
- Family: Scarabaeidae
- Genus: Liparetrus
- Species: L. abnormalis

Binomial name
- Liparetrus abnormalis MacLeay, 1886

Species of beetle

Liparetrus abnormalis is a species of beetle of the family Scarabaeidae. It is found in Australia (South Australia, Western Australia, Northern Territory, Victoria).

== Taxonomy ==
This species belongs to the gracilipes species group. The defining characters of this group include the absence of setae on the discs of the pronotum and elytra, while the pronotum is either without setae on the anterior margin or with only a few setae on each side.

== Description ==
Adults reach a length of about 8 mm (0.31 in). The head, pronotum and ventral surface are dark brown or black, while the elytra and abdomen are reddish brown and the legs dark brown.
