= Liparetrus squamosus =

Scientific classification
- Kingdom: Animalia
- Phylum: Arthropoda
- Clade: Pancrustacea
- Class: Insecta
- Order: Coleoptera
- Suborder: Polyphaga
- Infraorder: Scarabaeiformia
- Family: Scarabaeidae
- Genus: Liparetrus
- Species: L. squamosus

Binomial name
- Liparetrus squamosus Britton, 1980

Species of beetle

Liparetrus squamosus is a species of beetle of the family Scarabaeidae. It is found in Australia (Western Australia).

== Taxonomy ==
This species belongs to the discipennis species group. The defining characters of this group include the presence of long setae on the disc of the elytra (at least towards the base).

== Description ==
Adults reach a length of about 8.5 mm (0.33 in). They are similar to Liparetrus gravidus, but may be distinguished by fewer setiferous punctures on the pronotum, shorter setae on the base of the elytra, as well as the absence of setae on the propygidium and pygidium.
