= Liparetrus gravidus =

Scientific classification
- Kingdom: Animalia
- Phylum: Arthropoda
- Clade: Pancrustacea
- Class: Insecta
- Order: Coleoptera
- Suborder: Polyphaga
- Infraorder: Scarabaeiformia
- Family: Scarabaeidae
- Genus: Liparetrus
- Species: L. gravidus

Binomial name
- Liparetrus gravidus Blackburn, 1905

Species of beetle

Liparetrus gravidus is a species of beetle of the family Scarabaeidae. It is found in Australia (Western Australia).

== Taxonomy ==
This species belongs to the discipennis species group. The defining characters of this group include the presence of long setae on the disc of the elytra (at least towards the base).

== Description ==
Adults reach a length of about 7.5–11 mm (0.30–0.43 in). The head, pronotum, abdomen and ventral surface are black. The legs are partly dark brown and partly reddish. The antennae are also reddish.
