= Liparetrus orestes =

Scientific classification
- Kingdom: Animalia
- Phylum: Arthropoda
- Clade: Pancrustacea
- Class: Insecta
- Order: Coleoptera
- Suborder: Polyphaga
- Infraorder: Scarabaeiformia
- Family: Scarabaeidae
- Genus: Liparetrus
- Species: L. orestes

Binomial name
- Liparetrus orestes Britton, 1980

Species of beetle

Liparetrus orestes is a species of beetle of the family Scarabaeidae. It is found in Australia (New South Wales).

== Taxonomy ==
This species belongs to the discoidalis species group. The defining characters of this group include the pronotum with setae, but with scales on the disc.

== Description ==
Adults reach a length of about 5.25 mm (0.207 in). They are very similar to Liparetrus ulingus, but may be distinguished by the more transverse pronotum and male clypeus, the less prominent eyes and the shape of the aedeagus.
