= Liparetrus ulingus =

Scientific classification
- Kingdom: Animalia
- Phylum: Arthropoda
- Clade: Pancrustacea
- Class: Insecta
- Order: Coleoptera
- Suborder: Polyphaga
- Infraorder: Scarabaeiformia
- Family: Scarabaeidae
- Genus: Liparetrus
- Species: L. ulingus

Binomial name
- Liparetrus ulingus Britton, 1980

Species of beetle

Liparetrus ulingus is a species of beetle of the family Scarabaeidae. It is found in Australia (South Australia).

== Taxonomy ==
This species belongs to the discoidalis species group. The defining characters of this group include the pronotum with setae, but with scales on the disc.

== Description ==
Adults reach a length of about 6 mm (0.24 in). The head and pronotum are black, while the elytra are pale brownish yellow with black margins. The abdomen and ventral surface are dark brown, the legs dark reddish brown and the antennae reddish yellow, with a dark brown club.
