= Liparetrus alienus =

Scientific classification
- Kingdom: Animalia
- Phylum: Arthropoda
- Clade: Pancrustacea
- Class: Insecta
- Order: Coleoptera
- Suborder: Polyphaga
- Infraorder: Scarabaeiformia
- Family: Scarabaeidae
- Genus: Liparetrus
- Species: L. alienus

Binomial name
- Liparetrus alienus Blackburn, 1905

Species of beetle

Liparetrus alienus is a species of beetle of the family Scarabaeidae. It is found in Australia (Western Australia).

== Taxonomy ==
This species belongs to the alienus species group. The defining characters of this group include setae on the disc of the pronotum and the disc of the elytra.

== Description ==
Adults reach a length of about 3.5–4.5 mm (0.14–0.18 in). The head, pronotum, abdomen and ventral surface are black, while the elytra are brownish yellow. The scutellum is black with reddish edges and the legs are yellowish brown. The antennae are reddish brown with a black club.
