= Liparetrus impressicollis =

Scientific classification
- Kingdom: Animalia
- Phylum: Arthropoda
- Clade: Pancrustacea
- Class: Insecta
- Order: Coleoptera
- Suborder: Polyphaga
- Infraorder: Scarabaeiformia
- Family: Scarabaeidae
- Genus: Liparetrus
- Species: L. impressicollis

Binomial name
- Liparetrus impressicollis MacLeay, 1886

Species of beetle

Liparetrus impressicollis is a species of beetle of the family Scarabaeidae. It is found in Australia (New South Wales, Victoria).

== Taxonomy ==
This species belongs to the rufipennis species group. The defining characters of this group include the absence of setae and scales on the disc of the pronotum.

== Description ==
Adults reach a length of about 4–5 mm (0.16–0.20 in). They are similar to Liparetrus waningus, but the abdomen is black or yellowish brown and the elytra lack a membranous apical margin.
