= Liparetrus waningus =

Scientific classification
- Kingdom: Animalia
- Phylum: Arthropoda
- Clade: Pancrustacea
- Class: Insecta
- Order: Coleoptera
- Suborder: Polyphaga
- Infraorder: Scarabaeiformia
- Family: Scarabaeidae
- Genus: Liparetrus
- Species: L. waningus

Binomial name
- Liparetrus waningus Britton, 1980

Species of beetle

Liparetrus waningus is a species of beetle of the family Scarabaeidae. It is found in Australia (Western Australia).

== Taxonomy ==
This species belongs to the rufipennis species group. The defining characters of this group include the absence of setae and scales on the disc of the pronotum.

== Description ==
Adults reach a length of about 5 mm (0.20 in). The elytra are pale yellowish brown, while the rest of the body is black or very dark brown. The antennae are yellow with the club partly dark. The legs are pale yellowish brown.
