= Liparetrus vestjensi =

Scientific classification
- Kingdom: Animalia
- Phylum: Arthropoda
- Clade: Pancrustacea
- Class: Insecta
- Order: Coleoptera
- Suborder: Polyphaga
- Infraorder: Scarabaeiformia
- Family: Scarabaeidae
- Genus: Liparetrus
- Species: L. vestjensi

Binomial name
- Liparetrus vestjensi Britton, 1980

Species of beetle

Liparetrus vestjensi is a species of beetle of the family Scarabaeidae. It is found in Australia (Northern Territory).

== Taxonomy ==
This species belongs to the rufipennis species group. The defining characters of this group include the absence of setae and scales on the disc of the pronotum.

== Description ==
Adults reach a length of about 7–8.5 mm (0.28–0.33 in). They are similar to Liparetrus badius, but may be distinguished by the very dark brown frons and base of the clypeus, the more transverse pronotum and the shape of the aedeagus.
