= Liparetrus germari =

Scientific classification
- Kingdom: Animalia
- Phylum: Arthropoda
- Clade: Pancrustacea
- Class: Insecta
- Order: Coleoptera
- Suborder: Polyphaga
- Infraorder: Scarabaeiformia
- Family: Scarabaeidae
- Genus: Liparetrus
- Species: L. germari

Binomial name
- Liparetrus germari MacLeay, 1886

Synonyms
- Liparetrus insignis Lea, 1917; Liparetrus mastersi MacLeay, 1886

Species of beetle

Liparetrus germari is a species of beetle of the family Scarabaeidae. It is found in Australia (South Australia, Western Australia).

== Taxonomy ==
This species belongs to the marginipennis species group. The defining characters of this group include the presence of setae on the disc of the pronotum. The elytra normally also have setae on the disc, but these may be absent, in which case there is at least a continuous fringe of setae on the anterior margin.

== Description ==
Adults reach a length of about 11–14 mm (0.43–0.55 in). The head and pronotum are black, while the elytra are bright reddish brown with the basal area black or largely dark brown. The abdomen and ventral surface are black or dark brown, the legs reddish brown and the antennae yellowish with the apical half of the club black.
