= Liparetrus nigrinus =

Scientific classification
- Kingdom: Animalia
- Phylum: Arthropoda
- Clade: Pancrustacea
- Class: Insecta
- Order: Coleoptera
- Suborder: Polyphaga
- Infraorder: Scarabaeiformia
- Family: Scarabaeidae
- Genus: Liparetrus
- Species: L. nigrinus

Binomial name
- Liparetrus nigrinus Germar, 1848

Synonyms
- Liparetrus rugosus MacLeay, 1886

Species of beetle

Liparetrus nigrinus is a species of beetle of the family Scarabaeidae. It is found in Australia (South Australia).

== Taxonomy ==
This species belongs to the marginipennis species group. The defining characters of this group include the presence of setae on the disc of the pronotum. The elytra normally also have setae on the disc, but these may be absent, in which case there is at least a continuous fringe of setae on the anterior margin.

== Description ==
Adults reach a length of about 7–9 mm (0.28–0.35 in). The body is black or very dark reddish brown. The tarsi are reddish brown, while the rest of the legs are black. The antennae are yellowish brown with a black club.
