= Liparetrus laeticulus =

Scientific classification
- Kingdom: Animalia
- Phylum: Arthropoda
- Clade: Pancrustacea
- Class: Insecta
- Order: Coleoptera
- Suborder: Polyphaga
- Infraorder: Scarabaeiformia
- Family: Scarabaeidae
- Genus: Liparetrus
- Species: L. laeticulus

Binomial name
- Liparetrus laeticulus Blackburn, 1889

Species of beetle

Liparetrus laeticulus is a species of beetle of the family Scarabaeidae. It is found in Australia (South Australia, Victoria).

== Taxonomy ==
This species belongs to the gracilipes species group. The defining characters of this group include the absence of setae on the discs of the pronotum and elytra, while the pronotum is either without setae on the anterior margin or with only a few setae on each side.

== Description ==
Adults reach a length of about 3.5–4.5 mm (0.14–0.18 in). The head, pronotum, abdomen and ventral surface are black or dark brown, while the elytra are yellowish brown on the disc and brownish towards the base and sides. The legs and antennae are pale yellowish brown.
