= Liparetrus palmerstoni =

Scientific classification
- Kingdom: Animalia
- Phylum: Arthropoda
- Clade: Pancrustacea
- Class: Insecta
- Order: Coleoptera
- Suborder: Polyphaga
- Infraorder: Scarabaeiformia
- Family: Scarabaeidae
- Genus: Liparetrus
- Species: L. palmerstoni

Binomial name
- Liparetrus palmerstoni Blackburn, 1888

Species of beetle

Liparetrus palmerstoni is a species of beetle of the family Scarabaeidae. It is found in Australia (Northern Territory).

== Taxonomy ==
This species belongs to the lanaticollis species group. The defining characters of this group include the absence of setae on the disc of the elytra, Furthermore, the base and apex of the elytra are usually darker than the disc.

== Description ==
Adults reach a length of about 5 mm (0.20 in). The clypeus is yellowish brown, although sometimes with a black basal half. The frons is black and the pronotum is either completely yellowish brown or with dark brown margins. The rest of the body (including the legs) is yellowish brown.
