= Liparetrus convexus =

Scientific classification
- Kingdom: Animalia
- Phylum: Arthropoda
- Clade: Pancrustacea
- Class: Insecta
- Order: Coleoptera
- Suborder: Polyphaga
- Infraorder: Scarabaeiformia
- Family: Scarabaeidae
- Genus: Liparetrus
- Species: L. convexus

Binomial name
- Liparetrus convexus Boisduval, 1835

Synonyms
- Liparetrus macleayi Blackburn, 1888; Liparetrus salebrosus MacLeay, 1886; Liparetrus basalis Blanchard, 1850

Species of beetle

Liparetrus convexus is a species of beetle of the family Scarabaeidae. It is found in Australia (Victoria, Tasmania, New South Wales, South Australia, Queensland).

== Taxonomy ==
This species belongs to the ferrugineus species group.

== Description ==
Adults reach a length of about 5–6.5 mm (0.20–0.26 in). The body is black or black with the elytra reddish yellow on the distal two-thirds. The tarsi are yellowish brown.
