= Liparetrus umbrosus =

Scientific classification
- Kingdom: Animalia
- Phylum: Arthropoda
- Clade: Pancrustacea
- Class: Insecta
- Order: Coleoptera
- Suborder: Polyphaga
- Infraorder: Scarabaeiformia
- Family: Scarabaeidae
- Genus: Liparetrus
- Species: L. umbrosus

Binomial name
- Liparetrus umbrosus Britton, 1980

Species of beetle

Liparetrus umbrosus is a species of beetle of the family Scarabaeidae. It is found in Australia (South Australia, Victoria).

== Taxonomy ==
This species belongs to the marginipennis species group. The defining characters of this group include the presence of setae on the disc of the pronotum. The elytra normally also have setae on the disc, but these may be absent, in which case there is at least a continuous fringe of setae on the anterior margin.

== Description ==
Adults reach a length of about 7 mm (0.28 in). The head and pronotum are black, while the elytra, abdomen and ventral surface are dark brown. The elytra are sometimes dark reddish on the disc.
