= Liparetrus insolitus =

Scientific classification
- Kingdom: Animalia
- Phylum: Arthropoda
- Clade: Pancrustacea
- Class: Insecta
- Order: Coleoptera
- Suborder: Polyphaga
- Infraorder: Scarabaeiformia
- Family: Scarabaeidae
- Genus: Liparetrus
- Species: L. insolitus

Binomial name
- Liparetrus insolitus Blackburn, 1905

Species of beetle

Liparetrus insolitus is a species of beetle of the family Scarabaeidae. It is found in Australia (Western Australia).

== Taxonomy ==
This species belongs to the marginipennis species group. The defining characters of this group include the presence of setae on the disc of the pronotum. The elytra normally also have setae on the disc, but these may be absent, in which case there is at least a continuous fringe of setae on the anterior margin.

== Description ==
Adults reach a length of about 7 mm (0.28 in). The head, pronotum, ventral surface and abdomen are black, while the elytra are reddish brown with a black base. The antennae are reddish with a darker club.
