= Liparetrus merredinensis =

Scientific classification
- Kingdom: Animalia
- Phylum: Arthropoda
- Clade: Pancrustacea
- Class: Insecta
- Order: Coleoptera
- Suborder: Polyphaga
- Infraorder: Scarabaeiformia
- Family: Scarabaeidae
- Genus: Liparetrus
- Species: L. merredinensis

Binomial name
- Liparetrus merredinensis Britton, 1980

Species of beetle

Liparetrus merredinensis is a species of beetle of the family Scarabaeidae. It is found in Australia (Western Australia).

== Taxonomy ==
This species belongs to the striatus species group. The defining characters of this group include the absence of setae on the disc of the pronotum and scales or flattened, adpressed setae on the propygidium and usually also the pygidium.

== Description ==
Adults reach a length of about 6.5–8.5 mm (0.26–0.33 in). The head is piceous. The pronotum is dark reddish brown, becoming dark brown near the anterior margin. The elytra, abdomen and legs are dark reddish brown.
