= Liparetrus collessi =

Scientific classification
- Kingdom: Animalia
- Phylum: Arthropoda
- Clade: Pancrustacea
- Class: Insecta
- Order: Coleoptera
- Suborder: Polyphaga
- Infraorder: Scarabaeiformia
- Family: Scarabaeidae
- Genus: Liparetrus
- Species: L. collessi

Binomial name
- Liparetrus collessi Britton, 1980

Species of beetle

Liparetrus collessi is a species of beetle of the family Scarabaeidae. It is found in Australia (Western Australia).

== Taxonomy ==
This species belongs to the sericeus species group. The defining characters of this group include a suture on each side of the propygidium, the absence of setae on the disc of the pronotum and the short elytra.

== Description ==
Adults reach a length of about 6.5–8.5 mm (0.26–0.33 in). The head, pronotum, abdomen and ventral surface are black, while the elytra are black and iridescent. The legs are mainly black, but the tarsi are brown. The antennae are brown with a darker club.
