= Liparetrus tatakus =

Scientific classification
- Kingdom: Animalia
- Phylum: Arthropoda
- Clade: Pancrustacea
- Class: Insecta
- Order: Coleoptera
- Suborder: Polyphaga
- Infraorder: Scarabaeiformia
- Family: Scarabaeidae
- Genus: Liparetrus
- Species: L. tatakus

Binomial name
- Liparetrus tatakus Britton, 1980

Species of beetle

Liparetrus tatakus is a species of beetle of the family Scarabaeidae. It is found in Australia (Western Australia).

== Taxonomy ==
This species belongs to the lanaticollis species group. The defining characters of this group include the absence of setae on the disc of the elytra, Furthermore, the base and apex of the elytra are usually darker than the disc.

== Description ==
Adults reach a length of about 6 mm (0.24 in). The head is dark reddish brown and the pronotum is bright reddish brown. The elytra are yellowish brown with a darkened basal area and the abdomen is mostly reddish yellow.
