= Liparetrus satanus =

Scientific classification
- Kingdom: Animalia
- Phylum: Arthropoda
- Clade: Pancrustacea
- Class: Insecta
- Order: Coleoptera
- Suborder: Polyphaga
- Infraorder: Scarabaeiformia
- Family: Scarabaeidae
- Genus: Liparetrus
- Species: L. satanus

Binomial name
- Liparetrus satanus Britton, 1980

Species of beetle

Liparetrus satanus is a species of beetle of the family Scarabaeidae. It is found in Australia (South Australia, Western Australia).

== Taxonomy ==
This species belongs to the gracilipes species group. The defining characters of this group include the absence of setae on the discs of the pronotum and elytra, while the pronotum is either without setae on the anterior margin or with only a few setae on each side.

== Description ==
Adults reach a length of about 9–10.5 mm (0.35–0.41 in). They have a completely black body, or with the elytra reddish brown. The antennae are yellowish brown, with the club partly dark brown.
