= Liparetrus septuosus =

Scientific classification
- Kingdom: Animalia
- Phylum: Arthropoda
- Clade: Pancrustacea
- Class: Insecta
- Order: Coleoptera
- Suborder: Polyphaga
- Infraorder: Scarabaeiformia
- Family: Scarabaeidae
- Genus: Liparetrus
- Species: L. septuosus

Binomial name
- Liparetrus septuosus Britton, 1980

Species of beetle

Liparetrus septuosus is a species of beetle of the family Scarabaeidae. It is found in Australia (Queensland).

== Taxonomy ==
This species belongs to the concolor species group. The defining characters of this group include the absence of setae on the discs of the pronotum and elytra, while the pronotum has a fringe of setae along the anterior margin.

== Description ==
Adults reach a length of about 8 mm (0.31 in). The head is black and the pronotum is very dark brown to black. The elytra and legs are bright reddish brown, the abdomen reddish brown and the antennae yellowish to reddish brown.
