= Liparetrus fimbriatus =

Scientific classification
- Kingdom: Animalia
- Phylum: Arthropoda
- Clade: Pancrustacea
- Class: Insecta
- Order: Coleoptera
- Suborder: Polyphaga
- Infraorder: Scarabaeiformia
- Family: Scarabaeidae
- Genus: Liparetrus
- Species: L. fimbriatus

Binomial name
- Liparetrus fimbriatus Blackburn, 1888

Species of beetle

Liparetrus fimbriatus is a species of beetle of the family Scarabaeidae. It is found in Australia (South Australia).

== Taxonomy ==
This species belongs to the concolor species group. The defining characters of this group include the absence of setae on the discs of the pronotum and elytra, while the pronotum has a fringe of setae along the anterior margin.

== Description ==
Adults reach a length of about 7–8 mm (0.28–0.31 in). The head, pronotum and abdomen are black, while the elytra are reddish brown with a black base. The legs are dark reddish brown.
