= Liparetrus glabripennis =

Scientific classification
- Kingdom: Animalia
- Phylum: Arthropoda
- Clade: Pancrustacea
- Class: Insecta
- Order: Coleoptera
- Suborder: Polyphaga
- Infraorder: Scarabaeiformia
- Family: Scarabaeidae
- Genus: Liparetrus
- Species: L. glabripennis

Binomial name
- Liparetrus glabripennis MacLeay, 1886

Species of beetle

Liparetrus glabripennis is a species of beetle of the family Scarabaeidae. It is found in Australia (Victoria, Queensland).

== Taxonomy ==
This species belongs to the luridipennis species group. The defining characters of this group include setae on the disc of the pronotum.

== Description ==
Adults reach a length of about 5.5–7 mm (0.22–0.28 in). The head, pronotum and scutellum are black, while the elytra are pale yellowish brown and the abdomen and ventral surface are brown or dark brown. The antennae are yellowish brown with a darkened club.
