= Liparetrus monticola =

Scientific classification
- Kingdom: Animalia
- Phylum: Arthropoda
- Clade: Pancrustacea
- Class: Insecta
- Order: Coleoptera
- Suborder: Polyphaga
- Infraorder: Scarabaeiformia
- Family: Scarabaeidae
- Genus: Liparetrus
- Species: L. monticola

Binomial name
- Liparetrus monticola (Fabricius, 1775)

Synonyms
- Melolontha monticola Fabricius, 1775; Liparetrus blanchardi Blackburn, 1905; Liparetrus gagaticeps MacLeay, 1888

Species of beetle

Liparetrus monticola is a species of beetle of the family Scarabaeidae. It is found in Australia (Northern Territory, Queensland, Western Australia).

== Taxonomy ==
This species belongs to the monticola species group.

== Description ==
Adults reach a length of about 4 mm (0.16 in). The body is yellowish brown, with the head and ventral surface dark brown, or they are all black.
