= Liparetrus seclusus =

Scientific classification
- Kingdom: Animalia
- Phylum: Arthropoda
- Clade: Pancrustacea
- Class: Insecta
- Order: Coleoptera
- Suborder: Polyphaga
- Infraorder: Scarabaeiformia
- Family: Scarabaeidae
- Genus: Liparetrus
- Species: L. seclusus

Binomial name
- Liparetrus seclusus Britton, 1980

Species of beetle

Liparetrus seclusus is a species of beetle of the family Scarabaeidae. It is found in Australia (Western Australia).

== Taxonomy ==
This species belongs to the capillatus species group. The defining characters of this group include the absence of setae on the disc of the pronotum, although sometimes scales are present.

== Description ==
Adults reach a length of about 7.5 mm (0.30 in). The head, pronotum and ventral thorax are black, while the abdomen is reddish yellow with a darkened base. The elytra are bright reddish brown with a black base and slightly darkened sutural and lateral margins.
