= Liparetrus carnei =

Scientific classification
- Kingdom: Animalia
- Phylum: Arthropoda
- Clade: Pancrustacea
- Class: Insecta
- Order: Coleoptera
- Suborder: Polyphaga
- Infraorder: Scarabaeiformia
- Family: Scarabaeidae
- Genus: Liparetrus
- Species: L. carnei

Binomial name
- Liparetrus carnei Britton, 1980

Species of beetle

Liparetrus carnei is a species of beetle of the family Scarabaeidae. It is found in Australia (New South Wales).

== Taxonomy ==
This species belongs to the convexior species group. The defining characters of this group include the absence of setae and scales on the disc of the pronotum.

== Description ==
Adults reach a length of about 5–6.5 mm (0.20–0.26 in). The head, scutellum and ventral surface are black. The pronotum and abdomen are also black in males, but brownish yellow in females. The elytra are brownish yellow and the legs and antennae are brownish yellow.
