= Liparetrus sericeipennis =

Scientific classification
- Kingdom: Animalia
- Phylum: Arthropoda
- Clade: Pancrustacea
- Class: Insecta
- Order: Coleoptera
- Suborder: Polyphaga
- Infraorder: Scarabaeiformia
- Family: Scarabaeidae
- Genus: Liparetrus
- Species: L. sericeipennis

Binomial name
- Liparetrus sericeipennis MacLeay, 1886

Species of beetle

Liparetrus sericeipennis is a species of beetle of the family Scarabaeidae. It is found in Australia (New South Wales).

== Taxonomy ==
This species belongs to the dixoni species group. The defining characters of this group include the covering of broad scales on the clypeus, frons, pronotum and abdomen.

== Description ==
Adults reach a length of about 5.5 mm (0.22 in). The head and pronotum are black, while the abdomen is dark brown and the elytra reddish brown with a black base. The legs are mostly dark brown.
