= Liparetrus carpentariae =

Scientific classification
- Kingdom: Animalia
- Phylum: Arthropoda
- Clade: Pancrustacea
- Class: Insecta
- Order: Coleoptera
- Suborder: Polyphaga
- Infraorder: Scarabaeiformia
- Family: Scarabaeidae
- Genus: Liparetrus
- Species: L. carpentariae

Binomial name
- Liparetrus carpentariae Britton, 1980

Species of beetle

Liparetrus carpentariae is a species of beetle of the family Scarabaeidae. It is found in Australia (Northern Territory).

== Taxonomy ==
This species belongs to the rufipennis species group. The defining characters of this group include the absence of setae and scales on the disc of the pronotum.

== Description ==
Adults reach a length of about 5.6–5.9 mm (0.22–0.23 in). The head and pronotum are reddish yellow, while the elytra are pale yellowish brown and the abdomen is pale reddish brown, but darker at the base.
