= Liparetrus trivialis =

Scientific classification
- Kingdom: Animalia
- Phylum: Arthropoda
- Clade: Pancrustacea
- Class: Insecta
- Order: Coleoptera
- Suborder: Polyphaga
- Infraorder: Scarabaeiformia
- Family: Scarabaeidae
- Genus: Liparetrus
- Species: L. trivialis

Binomial name
- Liparetrus trivialis Britton, 1980

Species of beetle

Liparetrus trivialis is a species of beetle of the family Scarabaeidae. It is found in Australia (Queensland).

== Taxonomy ==
This species belongs to the luridipennis species group. The defining characters of this group include setae on the disc of the pronotum.

== Description ==
Adults reach a length of about 7 mm (0.28 in). The head, pronotum, scutellum, abdomen and ventral surface are black, while the elytra are yellowish brown and the legs dark brown or black. The antennae are reddish brown with a dark brown club.
