= Liparetrus necessarius =

Scientific classification
- Kingdom: Animalia
- Phylum: Arthropoda
- Clade: Pancrustacea
- Class: Insecta
- Order: Coleoptera
- Suborder: Polyphaga
- Infraorder: Scarabaeiformia
- Family: Scarabaeidae
- Genus: Liparetrus
- Species: L. necessarius

Binomial name
- Liparetrus necessarius Blackburn, 1905

Species of beetle

Liparetrus necessarius is a species of beetle of the family Scarabaeidae. It is found in Australia (Western Australia).

== Taxonomy ==
This species belongs to the luridipennis species group. The defining characters of this group include setae on the disc of the pronotum.

== Description ==
Adults reach a length of about 6–9 mm (0.24–0.35 in). The head is black with a brownish anterior margin of the clypeus. The pronotum, abdomen and the ventral surface are black and the elytra are reddish brown with a black base.
