= Liparetrus rugatus =

Scientific classification
- Kingdom: Animalia
- Phylum: Arthropoda
- Clade: Pancrustacea
- Class: Insecta
- Order: Coleoptera
- Suborder: Polyphaga
- Infraorder: Scarabaeiformia
- Family: Scarabaeidae
- Genus: Liparetrus
- Species: L. rugatus

Binomial name
- Liparetrus rugatus Blackburn, 1905

Species of beetle

Liparetrus rugatus is a species of beetle of the family Scarabaeidae. It is found in Australia (Queensland).

== Taxonomy ==
This species belongs to the capillatus species group. The defining characters of this group include the absence of setae on the disc of the pronotum, although sometimes scales are present.

== Description ==
Adults reach a length of about 7 mm (0.28 in). The head and pronotum are black, while the elytra are reddish brown with a black base. The abdomen is dark reddish brown and the legs are dark brown.
