= Liparetrus hilli =

Scientific classification
- Kingdom: Animalia
- Phylum: Arthropoda
- Clade: Pancrustacea
- Class: Insecta
- Order: Coleoptera
- Suborder: Polyphaga
- Infraorder: Scarabaeiformia
- Family: Scarabaeidae
- Genus: Liparetrus
- Species: L. hilli

Binomial name
- Liparetrus hilli Britton, 1980

Species of beetle

Liparetrus hilli is a species of beetle of the family Scarabaeidae. It is found in Australia (Northern Territory).

== Taxonomy ==
This species belongs to the rufipennis species group. The defining characters of this group include the absence of setae and scales on the disc of the pronotum.

== Description ==
Adults reach a length of about 7 mm (0.28 in). The frons is black and the clypeus is dark brown, but reddish anteriorly. The pronotum is reddish yellow. The rest of the body and legs is yellowish brown.
