= Liparetrus ebeninus =

Scientific classification
- Kingdom: Animalia
- Phylum: Arthropoda
- Clade: Pancrustacea
- Class: Insecta
- Order: Coleoptera
- Suborder: Polyphaga
- Infraorder: Scarabaeiformia
- Family: Scarabaeidae
- Genus: Liparetrus
- Species: L. ebeninus

Binomial name
- Liparetrus ebeninus MacLeay, 1886

Species of beetle

Liparetrus ebeninus is a species of beetle of the family Scarabaeidae. It is found in Australia (Western Australia).

== Taxonomy ==
This species belongs to the erythropterus species group. The defining characters of this group include the presence of setae on the disc of the pronotum, while these are absent on the disc of the elytra.

== Description ==
Adults reach a length of about 6 mm (0.24 in). The head and pronotum are black, while the elytra, abdomen and ventral surface are very dark brown or black.
