= Liparetrus orsinus =

Scientific classification
- Kingdom: Animalia
- Phylum: Arthropoda
- Clade: Pancrustacea
- Class: Insecta
- Order: Coleoptera
- Suborder: Polyphaga
- Infraorder: Scarabaeiformia
- Family: Scarabaeidae
- Genus: Liparetrus
- Species: L. orsinus

Binomial name
- Liparetrus orsinus Britton, 1980

Species of beetle

Liparetrus orsinus is a species of beetle of the family Scarabaeidae. It is found in Australia (Western Australia).

== Taxonomy ==
This species belongs to the rufipennis species group. The defining characters of this group include the absence of setae and scales on the disc of the pronotum.

== Description ==
Adults reach a length of about 12.5 mm (0.49 in). The clypeus is reddish yellow with black margins and the frons is black. The pronotum and elytra are finely punctured, with the surface between the punctures dull.
