= Liparetrus uniformis =

Scientific classification
- Kingdom: Animalia
- Phylum: Arthropoda
- Clade: Pancrustacea
- Class: Insecta
- Order: Coleoptera
- Suborder: Polyphaga
- Infraorder: Scarabaeiformia
- Family: Scarabaeidae
- Genus: Liparetrus
- Species: L. uniformis

Binomial name
- Liparetrus uniformis Blanchard, 1850

Species of beetle

Liparetrus uniformis is a species of beetle of the family Scarabaeidae. It is found in Australia (Western Australia).

== Taxonomy ==
This species belongs to the atratus species group. The defining characters of this group include the absence of scales on the clypeus, frons, pronotum and abdomen.

== Description ==
Adults reach a length of about 6.5 mm (0.26 in). The head, pronotum, abdomen and ventral surface are black, while the elytra are bright reddish and the legs dark brown.
