= Liparetrus urbulus =

Scientific classification
- Kingdom: Animalia
- Phylum: Arthropoda
- Clade: Pancrustacea
- Class: Insecta
- Order: Coleoptera
- Suborder: Polyphaga
- Infraorder: Scarabaeiformia
- Family: Scarabaeidae
- Genus: Liparetrus
- Species: L. urbulus

Binomial name
- Liparetrus urbulus Britton, 1980

Species of beetle

Liparetrus urbulus is a species of beetle of the family Scarabaeidae. It is found in Australia (Western Australia).

== Taxonomy ==
This species belongs to the fulvohirtus species group. The defining characters of this group include the presence of setae on the discs of the pronotum and elytra.

== Description ==
Adults reach a length of about 7 mm (0.28 in). They have a black body, with iridescent elytra. The antennae are pale yellowish brown with a dark brown club.
