= Liparetrus distans =

Scientific classification
- Kingdom: Animalia
- Phylum: Arthropoda
- Clade: Pancrustacea
- Class: Insecta
- Order: Coleoptera
- Suborder: Polyphaga
- Infraorder: Scarabaeiformia
- Family: Scarabaeidae
- Genus: Liparetrus
- Species: L. distans

Binomial name
- Liparetrus distans Blackburn, 1905

Species of beetle

Liparetrus distans is a species of beetle of the family Scarabaeidae. It is found in Australia (Western Australia, Queensland).

== Taxonomy ==
This species belongs to the rufipennis species group. The defining characters of this group include the absence of setae and scales on the disc of the pronotum.

== Description ==
Adults reach a length of about 9–12 mm (0.35–0.47 in). The body and legs are reddish brown, with the abdomen paler than the elytra.
