= Liparetrus erythropygus =

Scientific classification
- Kingdom: Animalia
- Phylum: Arthropoda
- Clade: Pancrustacea
- Class: Insecta
- Order: Coleoptera
- Suborder: Polyphaga
- Infraorder: Scarabaeiformia
- Family: Scarabaeidae
- Genus: Liparetrus
- Species: L. erythropygus

Binomial name
- Liparetrus erythropygus Blanchard, 1850

Species of beetle

Liparetrus erythropygus is a species of beetle of the family Scarabaeidae. It is found in Australia (New South Wales, Queensland).

== Taxonomy ==
This species belongs to the ferrugineus species group.

== Description ==
Adults reach a length of about 5–6.5 mm (0.20–0.26 in). They have a black body, with the apical half of the abdomen reddish and with the antennae yellowish brown.
