= Ataenius crenator =

Scientific classification
- Kingdom: Animalia
- Phylum: Arthropoda
- Clade: Pancrustacea
- Class: Insecta
- Order: Coleoptera
- Suborder: Polyphaga
- Infraorder: Scarabaeiformia
- Family: Scarabaeidae
- Genus: Ataenius
- Species: A. crenator

Binomial name
- Ataenius crenator Harold, 1876

Synonyms
- Ataenius nigritus Petrovitz, 1973

Species of beetle

Ataenius crenator is a species of beetle of the family Scarabaeidae. It is found in Brazil (Minas Gerais).

== Description ==
Adults reach a length of about 5.5 mm (0.22 in). They have an oval, slightly alutaceous, black body.
