= Ataenius tuberculatus =

Scientific classification
- Kingdom: Animalia
- Phylum: Arthropoda
- Clade: Pancrustacea
- Class: Insecta
- Order: Coleoptera
- Suborder: Polyphaga
- Infraorder: Scarabaeiformia
- Family: Scarabaeidae
- Genus: Ataenius
- Species: A. tuberculatus

Binomial name
- Ataenius tuberculatus Schmidt, 1911

Species of beetle

Ataenius tuberculatus is a species of beetle of the family Scarabaeidae. It is found in Bolivia, Brazil (Mato Grosso, Minas Gerais), Colombia, Guyana and Venezuela.

== Description ==
Adults reach a length of about 4.2–4.5 mm (0.17–0.18 in). They have a carbon black body, with the surface partially covered with a grey argillaceous coating.

== Life history ==
Specimens have been collected in open grassy savanna and marsh areas.
