= Ataenius jamaicensis =

Scientific classification
- Kingdom: Animalia
- Phylum: Arthropoda
- Clade: Pancrustacea
- Class: Insecta
- Order: Coleoptera
- Suborder: Polyphaga
- Infraorder: Scarabaeiformia
- Family: Scarabaeidae
- Genus: Ataenius
- Species: A. jamaicensis

Binomial name
- Ataenius jamaicensis Chapin, 1940

Species of beetle

Ataenius jamaicensis is a species of beetle of the family Scarabaeidae. It is found in Jamaica.

== Description ==
Adults reach a length of about 4–4.5 mm (0.16–0.18 in). They have an oblong-oval, microreticulate, shining, reddish brown to castaneous body, with the elytra light brown to orange with intervals 2-5 and 7 partly longitudinally darkened, and the lateral intervals and apex of the elytra finely setigerous.
