= Ataenius cochabambae =

Scientific classification
- Kingdom: Animalia
- Phylum: Arthropoda
- Clade: Pancrustacea
- Class: Insecta
- Order: Coleoptera
- Suborder: Polyphaga
- Infraorder: Scarabaeiformia
- Family: Scarabaeidae
- Genus: Ataenius
- Species: A. cochabambae

Binomial name
- Ataenius cochabambae Stebnicka, 2005

Species of beetle

Ataenius cochabambae is a species of beetle of the family Scarabaeidae. It is found in Bolivia.

== Description ==
Adults reach a length of about 4–4.2 mm (0.16–0.17 in). They have an elongate, moderately convex, glabrous and shining body. They are dark brown, with the anterior of the clypeus, sides of the pronotum and legs paler.
