= Ataenius raccurti =

Scientific classification
- Kingdom: Animalia
- Phylum: Arthropoda
- Clade: Pancrustacea
- Class: Insecta
- Order: Coleoptera
- Suborder: Polyphaga
- Infraorder: Scarabaeiformia
- Family: Scarabaeidae
- Genus: Ataenius
- Species: A. raccurti

Binomial name
- Ataenius raccurti Chalumeau, 1978

Species of beetle

Ataenius raccurti is a species of beetle of the family Scarabaeidae. It is found in the Dominican Republic, Hispaniola, Jamaica.

== Description ==
Adults reach a length of about 3.8–4.2 mm (0.15–0.17 in). They have an oblong-oval, black, moderately shining body.
