= Ataenius luteomargo =

Scientific classification
- Kingdom: Animalia
- Phylum: Arthropoda
- Clade: Pancrustacea
- Class: Insecta
- Order: Coleoptera
- Suborder: Polyphaga
- Infraorder: Scarabaeiformia
- Family: Scarabaeidae
- Genus: Ataenius
- Species: A. luteomargo

Binomial name
- Ataenius luteomargo Chapin, 1940

Species of beetle

Ataenius luteomargo is a species of beetle of the family Scarabaeidae. It is found in Antigua, Barbados, Désirade, Dominican Republic, Guadeloupe, Jamaica, Les Saintes, Marie-Galante, Martinica, Montserrat, Panama, Puerto Rico, Saint Kitts and Nevis, Saint Lucia, Suriname and Venezuela.

== Description ==
Adults reach a length of about 4–4.6 mm (0.16–0.18 in). They have a dark brown to piceous body, with the outer intervals and apex of the elytra yellowish to reddish yellow.
