= Ataenius gibbus =

Scientific classification
- Kingdom: Animalia
- Phylum: Arthropoda
- Clade: Pancrustacea
- Class: Insecta
- Order: Coleoptera
- Suborder: Polyphaga
- Infraorder: Scarabaeiformia
- Family: Scarabaeidae
- Genus: Ataenius
- Species: A. gibbus

Binomial name
- Ataenius gibbus Blackburn, 1904

Species of beetle

Ataenius gibbus is a species of beetle of the family Scarabaeidae. It is found in Australia (New South Wales, Queensland).

== Description ==
Adults reach a length of about 3.8–4.8 mm (0.15–0.19 in). They have an oblong-oval, convex, slightly shining, reddish-black to black body, with the anterior margin of the clypeus and of the pronotum, as well as the legs reddish.
