= Ataenius walkeri =

Scientific classification
- Kingdom: Animalia
- Phylum: Arthropoda
- Clade: Pancrustacea
- Class: Insecta
- Order: Coleoptera
- Suborder: Polyphaga
- Infraorder: Scarabaeiformia
- Family: Scarabaeidae
- Genus: Ataenius
- Species: A. walkeri

Binomial name
- Ataenius walkeri Blackburn, 1904

Species of beetle

Ataenius walkeri is a species of beetle of the family Scarabaeidae. It is found in Australia (Northern Territory, Queensland, Western Australia).

== Description ==
Adults reach a length of about 2.5–3 mm (0.098–0.118 in). They have an elongate-oval, slightly shining, alutaceous, black, dark brown or sometimes rusty brown body, often with the elytra lighter than the head and pronotum, and sometimes with the anterior of the clypeus and legs reddish. The dorsal surface is glabrous.
