= Ataenius gracilis =

Scientific classification
- Kingdom: Animalia
- Phylum: Arthropoda
- Clade: Pancrustacea
- Class: Insecta
- Order: Coleoptera
- Suborder: Polyphaga
- Infraorder: Scarabaeiformia
- Family: Scarabaeidae
- Genus: Ataenius
- Species: A. gracilis

Binomial name
- Ataenius gracilis (Melsheimer, 1845)

Synonyms
- Oxyomus gracilis Melsheimer, 1845; Saprosites nocturnus Nomura, 1943

Species of beetle

Ataenius gracilis, the slender small dung beetle, is a species of aphodiine dung beetle in the family Scarabaeidae.

== Description ==
Adults reach a length of about 2.8–3.5 mm (0.11–0.14 in).

== Distribution ==
Neotropical: Argentina, Barbados, Brazil (Amazonas, Bahia, Distrito Federal, Goiás, Mato Grosso, Minas Gerais, Pará, Rio de Janeiro, São Paulo), Chile, Colombia, Cuba, Dominican Republic, Ecuador, Galapagos Islands, Grenada, Guadeloupe, Hispaniola, Jamaica, Marie-Galante, Martinique, Mexico (Baja California, Chiapas, Durango, Nayarit, Oaxaca, Sinaloa, Sonora, Tabasco, Tamaulipas, Veracruz), Nicaragua, Panama, Peru, Puerto Rico, Saint Croix, Saint Kitts and Nevis, Saint Vincent, Suriname, Vieques. Nearctic: Canada (Ontario, Quebec), United States (Florida, Indiana, Iowa, Maryland, Nebraska, Ohio, South Carolina, South Dakota, Texas, Virginia, Wisconsin).
