= Ataenius ecruensis =

Scientific classification
- Kingdom: Animalia
- Phylum: Arthropoda
- Clade: Pancrustacea
- Class: Insecta
- Order: Coleoptera
- Suborder: Polyphaga
- Infraorder: Scarabaeiformia
- Family: Scarabaeidae
- Genus: Ataenius
- Species: A. ecruensis

Binomial name
- Ataenius ecruensis Stebnicka & Lago, 2005

Species of beetle

Ataenius ecruensis is a species of beetle of the family Scarabaeidae. It is found in the United States (Mississippi, North Carolina).

== Description ==
Adults reach a length of about 4.8–5 mm (0.19–0.20 in). They have an elongate oblong, moderately convex, shiny, black body, with the legs reddish brown.
