= Ataenius oaxacaensis =

Scientific classification
- Kingdom: Animalia
- Phylum: Arthropoda
- Clade: Pancrustacea
- Class: Insecta
- Order: Coleoptera
- Suborder: Polyphaga
- Infraorder: Scarabaeiformia
- Family: Scarabaeidae
- Genus: Ataenius
- Species: A. oaxacaensis

Binomial name
- Ataenius oaxacaensis Stebnicka & Lago, 2005

Species of beetle

Ataenius oaxacaensis is a species of beetle of the family Scarabaeidae. It is found in Mexico (Oaxaca).

== Description ==
Adults reach a length of about 5.2–6 mm (0.20–0.24 in). They have an elongate, parallel-sided, slightly alutaceous and moderately shiny body. They are castaneous, with the elytra somewhat lighter than the fore body.
