= Ataenius koebelei =

Scientific classification
- Kingdom: Animalia
- Phylum: Arthropoda
- Clade: Pancrustacea
- Class: Insecta
- Order: Coleoptera
- Suborder: Polyphaga
- Infraorder: Scarabaeiformia
- Family: Scarabaeidae
- Genus: Ataenius
- Species: A. koebelei

Binomial name
- Ataenius koebelei Blackburn, 1904

Synonyms
- Dialytes granifer Schmidt, 1909

Species of beetle

Ataenius koebelei is a species of beetle of the family Scarabaeidae. It is found in Australia (Queensland) and Papua New Guinea.

== Description ==
Adults reach a length of about 4–5.1 mm (0.16–0.20 in). They have an oblong-oval, alutaceous, vaguely shining, greyish-black body, which is partially covered with an argillaceous coating. The legs are reddish brown.
