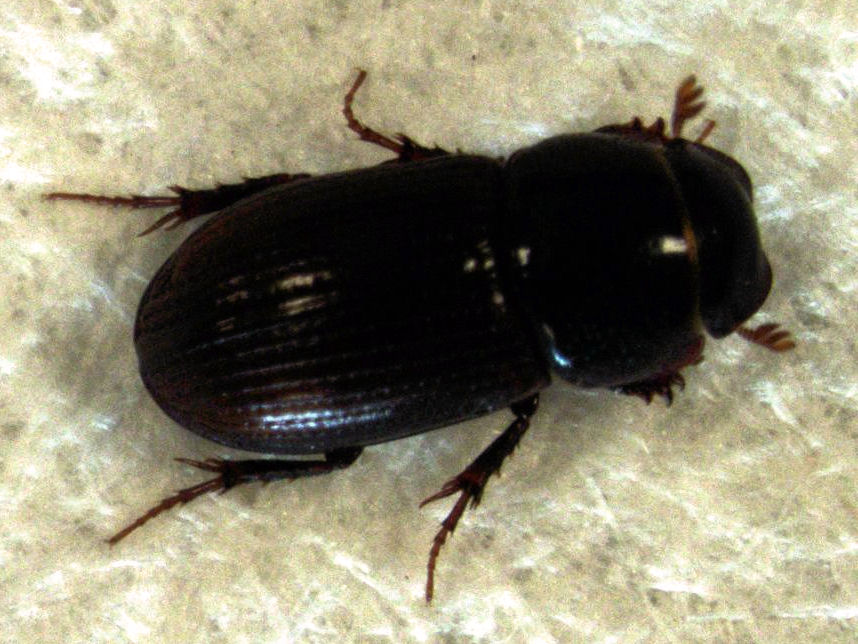

Scientific classification
- Kingdom: Animalia
- Phylum: Arthropoda
- Clade: Pancrustacea
- Class: Insecta
- Order: Coleoptera
- Suborder: Polyphaga
- Infraorder: Scarabaeiformia
- Family: Scarabaeidae
- Genus: Ataenius
- Species: A. brouni

Binomial name
- Ataenius brouni (Sharp, 1876)

Synonyms
- Aphodius brouni Sharp, 1876; Ataenius macilentus Blackburn, 1904

= Ataenius brouni =

Species of beetle

Ataenius brouni, Broun's scarab, is a species of beetle of the family Scarabaeidae. It is found in Australia (Australian Capital Territory, New South Wales, South Australia, Tasmania) and New Zealand.

== Description ==
Adults reach a length of about 3–4 mm (0.12–0.16 in). They have an elongate-oval, moderately shiny, reddish black to black body, with the margins of the pronotum and legs reddish. The elytra are often also reddish.

== Life history ==
Specimens have been collected under moss and stones, but also in pastures and lawns.
