= Ataenius purator =

Scientific classification
- Kingdom: Animalia
- Phylum: Arthropoda
- Clade: Pancrustacea
- Class: Insecta
- Order: Coleoptera
- Suborder: Polyphaga
- Infraorder: Scarabaeiformia
- Family: Scarabaeidae
- Genus: Ataenius
- Species: A. purator

Binomial name
- Ataenius purator Harold, 1868

Synonyms
- Ataenius gagates Petrovitz, 1963; Ataenius splendens Endrödi, 1962; Ataenius gothi Balthasar, 1933

Species of beetle

Ataenius purator is a species of beetle of the family Scarabaeidae. It is found in Argentina, Bolivia, Brazil (Amazonas, Bahia, Mato Grosso, Minas Gerais, Pará, Rio Grande do Sul, Roraima, Rio de Janeiro, Rio Grande do Sul, Santa Catarina, São Paulo), Colombia, Guyana, Paraguay, Suriname, Uruguay and Venezuela.

== Description ==
Adults reach a length of about 4–5 mm (0.16–0.20 in). They have an elongate, parallel-sided, shiny black to rusty-brown body.

== Life history ==
Specimens have been collected in savanna areas, wet grasslands and wet forests.
