= Ataenius opatroides =

Scientific classification
- Kingdom: Animalia
- Phylum: Arthropoda
- Clade: Pancrustacea
- Class: Insecta
- Order: Coleoptera
- Suborder: Polyphaga
- Infraorder: Scarabaeiformia
- Family: Scarabaeidae
- Genus: Ataenius
- Species: A. opatroides

Binomial name
- Ataenius opatroides (Blanchard, 1847)

Synonyms
- Oxyomus opatroides Blanchard, 1847

Species of beetle

Ataenius opatroides is a species of beetle of the family Scarabaeidae. It is found in Argentina, Chile and Uruguay.

== Description ==
Adults reach a length of about 5–5.2 mm (0.20–0.20 in). They have an oblong oval, subopaque, piceous black or rusty brown body.

== Life history ==
Specimens have been collected in soil and in horse and cattle excrements.
