= Ataenius speculator =

Scientific classification
- Kingdom: Animalia
- Phylum: Arthropoda
- Clade: Pancrustacea
- Class: Insecta
- Order: Coleoptera
- Suborder: Polyphaga
- Infraorder: Scarabaeiformia
- Family: Scarabaeidae
- Genus: Ataenius
- Species: A. speculator

Binomial name
- Ataenius speculator Blackburn, 1891

Species of beetle

Ataenius speculator is a species of beetle of the family Scarabaeidae. It is found in Australia (Australian Capital Territory, New South Wales, Victoria).

== Description ==
Adults reach a length of about 4–4.9 mm (0.16–0.19 in). They have an oblong-oval, convex, slightly shining, black body, usually covered with an argillaceous coating.
