= Ataenius striatocrenatus =

Scientific classification
- Kingdom: Animalia
- Phylum: Arthropoda
- Clade: Pancrustacea
- Class: Insecta
- Order: Coleoptera
- Suborder: Polyphaga
- Infraorder: Scarabaeiformia
- Family: Scarabaeidae
- Genus: Ataenius
- Species: A. striatocrenatus

Binomial name
- Ataenius striatocrenatus (Fairmaire, 1889)

Synonyms
- Oxyomus striatocrenatus Fairmaire, 1889

Species of beetle

Ataenius striatocrenatus is a species of beetle of the family Scarabaeidae. It is found in Myanmar and possibly also in China.

== Description ==
Adults reach a length of about 7 mm (0.28 in). They have an elongate-oval, glossy, black body.
