= Ataenius saltae =

Scientific classification
- Kingdom: Animalia
- Phylum: Arthropoda
- Clade: Pancrustacea
- Class: Insecta
- Order: Coleoptera
- Suborder: Polyphaga
- Infraorder: Scarabaeiformia
- Family: Scarabaeidae
- Genus: Ataenius
- Species: A. saltae

Binomial name
- Ataenius saltae Stebnicka, 2007

Species of beetle

Ataenius saltae is a species of beetle of the family Scarabaeidae. It is found in Argentina and Bolivia.

== Description ==
Adults reach a length of about 3–3.5 mm (0.12–0.14 in). They have a parallel-sided, alutaceous, piceous body, with the anterior of the clypeus, anterior angles of the pronotum and legs reddish-brown. They are weakly shining above.
