= Ataenius platensis =

Scientific classification
- Kingdom: Animalia
- Phylum: Arthropoda
- Clade: Pancrustacea
- Class: Insecta
- Order: Coleoptera
- Suborder: Polyphaga
- Infraorder: Scarabaeiformia
- Family: Scarabaeidae
- Genus: Ataenius
- Species: A. platensis

Binomial name
- Ataenius platensis (Blanchard, 1847)

Synonyms
- Ataenius anticus Fall, 1930; Ataenius degallieri Chalumeau, 1990; Ataenius granchaocensis Balthasar, 1939; Ataenius heyrovskyi Balthasar, 1960; Ataenius histrionicus Balthasar, 1947; Ataenius integer Harold, 1868

Species of beetle

Ataenius platensis is a species of aphodiine dung beetle in the family Scarabaeidae. It is found in the Caribbean Sea, Central America, North America, and South America.

== Description ==
Adults reach a length of about 3.5–5 mm (0.14–0.20 in). They have an elongate-oblong, shining, light brown, reddish brown to piceous body, with the legs usually reddish.

== Distribution ==
Nearctic: United States (California, Florida, Iowa, North Carolina, Oklahoma, South Carolina, Texas). Neotropical: Argentina, Belize, Bolivia, Brazil (Acre, Amazonas, Bahia, Distrito Federal, Espírito Santo, Goiás, Maranhão, Mato Grosso, Mato Grosso do Sul, Minas Gerais, Pará, Paraíba, Paraná, Pernambuco, Rio de Janeiro, Rio Grande do Sul, Rondônia, Roraima, Santa Catarina, São Paulo), Chile, Colombia, Costa Rica, Ecuador, El Salvador, Guatemala, Honduras, Mexico (Baja California Sur, Chiapas, Coahuila, Hidalgo, Nuevo León, Oaxaca, Puebla, San Luis Potosí, Tamaulipas, Veracruz), Panama, Paraguay, Peru, Uruguay, Venezuela. West Indies: Guadeloupe.

== Life history ==
It is found in various habitats from sea level to about 1000 meters, where it has been collected from forest litter and cattle dung.
