= Ataenius cognatus =

Scientific classification
- Kingdom: Animalia
- Phylum: Arthropoda
- Clade: Pancrustacea
- Class: Insecta
- Order: Coleoptera
- Suborder: Polyphaga
- Infraorder: Scarabaeiformia
- Family: Scarabaeidae
- Genus: Ataenius
- Species: A. cognatus

Binomial name
- Ataenius cognatus (LeConte, 1858)

Synonyms
- Euparia cognata LeConte, 1858

Species of beetle

Ataenius cognatus, the slender dung beetle, is a species of aphodiine dung beetle in the family Scarabaeidae. It is found in the United States (Arizona, California, Indiana, Florida, Iowa, Kansas, Louisiana, Mississippi, Missouri, Oklahoma, Texas) and Mexico (Coahuila, Nuevo León, San Luis Potosí, Sonora, Tamaulipas).

== Description ==
Adults reach a length of about 4.2–5.5 mm (0.17–0.22 in). They have an elongate-oblong, shiny black body, with the legs usually reddish-black.
