= Ataenius isabelae =

Scientific classification
- Kingdom: Animalia
- Phylum: Arthropoda
- Clade: Pancrustacea
- Class: Insecta
- Order: Coleoptera
- Suborder: Polyphaga
- Infraorder: Scarabaeiformia
- Family: Scarabaeidae
- Genus: Ataenius
- Species: A. isabelae

Binomial name
- Ataenius isabelae Franz, 1985

Species of beetle

Ataenius isabelae is a species of beetle of the family Scarabaeidae. It is found on the Galapagos Islands.

== Description ==
Adults reach a length of about 2–2.2 mm (0.079–0.087 in).

== Life history ==
Specimens have been collected in the scalesia forest zone.
