= Ataenius scabrelloides =

Scientific classification
- Kingdom: Animalia
- Phylum: Arthropoda
- Clade: Pancrustacea
- Class: Insecta
- Order: Coleoptera
- Suborder: Polyphaga
- Infraorder: Scarabaeiformia
- Family: Scarabaeidae
- Genus: Ataenius
- Species: A. scabrelloides

Binomial name
- Ataenius scabrelloides Petrovitz, 1962

Synonyms
- Ataenius superficialis Cartwright, 1974

Species of beetle

Ataenius scabrelloides is a species of beetle of the family Scarabaeidae. It is found in Bolivia, Brazil (Bahia, Espírito Santo, Goiás, Maranhão, Mato Grosso, Mato Grosso do Sul, Minas Gerais, Pernambuco, Piauí), Costa Rica, French Guiana, Jamaica, Panama, Suriname, Trinidad & Tobago, Venezuela and in the United States (Florida).

== Description ==
Adults reach a length of about 3–3.8 mm (0.12–0.15 in). They have an oblong-oval, slightly shiny body, entirely or partially covered with a greyish argillaceous coating or oily dirt. They are dark brown to piceous, reddish brown or castaneous.

== Life history ==
Specimens have been collected in woodland and grassland areas, taken from horse dung.
