= Ataenius tindalensis =

Scientific classification
- Kingdom: Animalia
- Phylum: Arthropoda
- Clade: Pancrustacea
- Class: Insecta
- Order: Coleoptera
- Suborder: Polyphaga
- Infraorder: Scarabaeiformia
- Family: Scarabaeidae
- Genus: Ataenius
- Species: A. tindalensis

Binomial name
- Ataenius tindalensis Stebnicka & Howden, 1997

Species of beetle

Ataenius tindalensis is a species of beetle of the family Scarabaeidae. It is found in Australia (Northern Territory, Queensland).

== Description ==
Adults reach a length of about 3.2–4 mm (0.13–0.16 in). They have an elongate, opaque, setigerous, greyish black body, covered with an argillaceous coating. The legs are reddish-brown.
