= Ataenius windjanae =

Scientific classification
- Kingdom: Animalia
- Phylum: Arthropoda
- Clade: Pancrustacea
- Class: Insecta
- Order: Coleoptera
- Suborder: Polyphaga
- Infraorder: Scarabaeiformia
- Family: Scarabaeidae
- Genus: Ataenius
- Species: A. windjanae

Binomial name
- Ataenius windjanae Stebnicka & Howden, 1997

Species of beetle

Ataenius windjanae is a species of beetle of the family Scarabaeidae. It is found in Australia (Western Australia).

== Description ==
Adults reach a length of about 3.2–3.7 mm (0.13–0.15 in). They have an elongate, glabrous, shining, black body, with the anterior of the clypeus, anterior margin of the pronotum and legs reddish.
