= Ataenius londrinae =

Scientific classification
- Kingdom: Animalia
- Phylum: Arthropoda
- Clade: Pancrustacea
- Class: Insecta
- Order: Coleoptera
- Suborder: Polyphaga
- Infraorder: Scarabaeiformia
- Family: Scarabaeidae
- Genus: Ataenius
- Species: A. londrinae

Binomial name
- Ataenius londrinae Stebnicka, 2007

Species of beetle

Ataenius londrinae is a species of beetle of the family Scarabaeidae. It is found in Argentina, Bolivia, Brazil (Bahia, Mato Grosso, Minas Gerais, Pará, Paraná, Rio de Janeiro, Rio Grande do Sul, Rondônia, Santa Catarina, São Paulo), Ecuador and Paraguay.

== Description ==
Adults reach a length of about 2.8–3.1 mm (0.11–0.12 in). They have a moderately shining, dark brown to piceous black body, with reddish brown legs.
