= Ataenius clavatus =

Scientific classification
- Kingdom: Animalia
- Phylum: Arthropoda
- Clade: Pancrustacea
- Class: Insecta
- Order: Coleoptera
- Suborder: Polyphaga
- Infraorder: Scarabaeiformia
- Family: Scarabaeidae
- Genus: Ataenius
- Species: A. clavatus

Binomial name
- Ataenius clavatus Schmidt, 1917

Species of beetle

Ataenius clavatus is a species of beetle of the family Scarabaeidae. It is found in Argentina and Brazil (Mato Grosso, Mato Grosso do Sul, Minas Gerais, São Paulo).

== Description ==
Adults reach a length of about 4–4.8 mm (0.16–0.19 in). They have an elongate oblong, convex, moderately shiny, dark brown to piceous body, with the ventral surface and legs reddish-brown.

== Life history ==
Specimens have been collected in riverine forests.
