= Ataenius exiguus =

Scientific classification
- Kingdom: Animalia
- Phylum: Arthropoda
- Clade: Pancrustacea
- Class: Insecta
- Order: Coleoptera
- Suborder: Polyphaga
- Infraorder: Scarabaeiformia
- Family: Scarabaeidae
- Genus: Ataenius
- Species: A. exiguus

Binomial name
- Ataenius exiguus Brown, 1932

Synonyms
- Ataenius abditus exiguus Brown, 1932

Species of beetle

Ataenius exiguus is a species of aphodiine dung beetle in the family Scarabaeidae. It is found in the United States (Florida, Maryland, Mississippi, North Carolina, South Carolina).
