= Ataenius palustris =

Scientific classification
- Kingdom: Animalia
- Phylum: Arthropoda
- Clade: Pancrustacea
- Class: Insecta
- Order: Coleoptera
- Suborder: Polyphaga
- Infraorder: Scarabaeiformia
- Family: Scarabaeidae
- Genus: Ataenius
- Species: A. palustris

Binomial name
- Ataenius palustris (Montrouzier, 1860)

Synonyms
- Aphodius palustris Montrouzier, 1860

Species of beetle

Ataenius palustris is a species of beetle of the family Scarabaeidae. It is found in New Caledonia.

== Description ==
Adults reach a length of about 4.5–5.7 mm (0.18–0.22 in). They are pubescent. The head and pronotum are glossy brownish-black, with the margin of the clypeus and the anterior angles of the pronotum reddish-brown. The scutellum is brownish-yellow with darker sides. The elytra are brownish-yellow with darker spots or brownish-yellow with darker striae. The legs are reddish-brown.
