= Ataenius luctuosus =

Scientific classification
- Kingdom: Animalia
- Phylum: Arthropoda
- Clade: Pancrustacea
- Class: Insecta
- Order: Coleoptera
- Suborder: Polyphaga
- Infraorder: Scarabaeiformia
- Family: Scarabaeidae
- Genus: Ataenius
- Species: A. luctuosus

Binomial name
- Ataenius luctuosus (Burmeister, 1877)

Synonyms
- Euparia luctuosa Burmeister, 1877; Ataenius tectus Petrovitz, 1973

Species of beetle

Ataenius luctuosus is a species of beetle of the family Scarabaeidae. It is found in Argentina, Brazil and Paraguay.

== Description ==
Adults reach a length of about 4–4.8 mm (0.16–0.19 in). They have a rather robust, piceous black body, with the surface partially covered with a brown argillaceous coating.
