= Ataenius elongatulus =

Scientific classification
- Kingdom: Animalia
- Phylum: Arthropoda
- Clade: Pancrustacea
- Class: Insecta
- Order: Coleoptera
- Suborder: Polyphaga
- Infraorder: Scarabaeiformia
- Family: Scarabaeidae
- Genus: Ataenius
- Species: A. elongatulus

Binomial name
- Ataenius elongatulus (MacLeay, 1888)

Synonyms
- Ammoecius elongatulus MacLeay, 1888; Ataenius taylori Petrovitz, 1975

Species of beetle

Ataenius elongatulus is a species of beetle of the family Scarabaeidae. It is found in Australia (Northern Territory, Queensland, Western Australia).

== Description ==
Adults reach a length of about 3.5–3.8 mm (0.14–0.15 in). They have an elongate, glabrous, subopaque (with a greyish lustre), reddish-brown or blackish-brown body, sometimes with the elytra lighter than the pronotum.
