= Ataenius elongatus =

Scientific classification
- Kingdom: Animalia
- Phylum: Arthropoda
- Clade: Pancrustacea
- Class: Insecta
- Order: Coleoptera
- Suborder: Polyphaga
- Infraorder: Scarabaeiformia
- Family: Scarabaeidae
- Genus: Ataenius
- Species: A. elongatus

Binomial name
- Ataenius elongatus (Palisot de Beauvois, 1811)

Synonyms
- Scarabaeus elongatus Palisot de Beauvois, 1811

Species of beetle

Ataenius elongatus is a species of beetle of the family Scarabaeidae. It is found in the Dominican Republic, Haiti and Hispaniola.

== Description ==
Adults reach a length of about 5.1–5.7 mm (0.20–0.22 in). They have a rather robust, piceous black, feebly shining body.
