= Ataenius benarabyensis =

Scientific classification
- Kingdom: Animalia
- Phylum: Arthropoda
- Clade: Pancrustacea
- Class: Insecta
- Order: Coleoptera
- Suborder: Polyphaga
- Infraorder: Scarabaeiformia
- Family: Scarabaeidae
- Genus: Ataenius
- Species: A. benarabyensis

Binomial name
- Ataenius benarabyensis Stebnicka & Howden, 1997

Species of beetle

Ataenius benarabyensis is a species of beetle of the family Scarabaeidae. It is found in Australia (New South Wales, Queensland).

== Description ==
Adults reach a length of about 4–4.5 mm (0.16–0.18 in). They have an elongate-oval, convex, dull, finely setaceous, black or brownish-black body, with the anterior of the clypeus and legs reddish. Sometimes, the ventral surface is also reddish.
