= Ataenius montreuili =

Scientific classification
- Kingdom: Animalia
- Phylum: Arthropoda
- Clade: Pancrustacea
- Class: Insecta
- Order: Coleoptera
- Suborder: Polyphaga
- Infraorder: Scarabaeiformia
- Family: Scarabaeidae
- Genus: Ataenius
- Species: A. montreuili

Binomial name
- Ataenius montreuili Bordat & Théry, 2012

Species of beetle

Ataenius montreuili is a species of beetle of the family Scarabaeidae. It is found in New Caledonia.

== Description ==
Adults reach a length of about 3.5–3.8 mm (0.14–0.15 in). They have a convex, shiny, pubescent body, with the head and pronotum dark brown, but the margin of the clypeus and the anterior angles of the pronotum with reddish-brown translucency. The elytra are reddish-brown with a dark discal spot. The legs are reddish-brown.

== Etymology ==
The species is named in honour of Scarabaeidae specialist Olivier Montreuil.
