= Ataenius iquitosae =

Scientific classification
- Kingdom: Animalia
- Phylum: Arthropoda
- Clade: Pancrustacea
- Class: Insecta
- Order: Coleoptera
- Suborder: Polyphaga
- Infraorder: Scarabaeiformia
- Family: Scarabaeidae
- Genus: Ataenius
- Species: A. iquitosae

Binomial name
- Ataenius iquitosae Stebnicka, 2007

Species of beetle

Ataenius iquitosae is a species of beetle of the family Scarabaeidae. It is found in Peru.

== Description ==
Adults reach a length of about 4–4.6 mm (0.16–0.18 in). They have a shining, piceous body, covered with a fine greyish coating, mostly on the sides.
