= Ataenius hispidus =

Scientific classification
- Kingdom: Animalia
- Phylum: Arthropoda
- Clade: Pancrustacea
- Class: Insecta
- Order: Coleoptera
- Suborder: Polyphaga
- Infraorder: Scarabaeiformia
- Family: Scarabaeidae
- Genus: Ataenius
- Species: A. hispidus

Binomial name
- Ataenius hispidus Harold, 1867

Species of beetle

Ataenius hispidus is a species of beetle of the family Scarabaeidae. It is found in Suriname and Venezuela.

== Description ==
Adults reach a length of about 5–6 mm (0.20–0.24 in). They have a shining black, partially setaceous body.

== Life history ==
Specimens have been collected in wet forests.
