= Ataenius vinacoensis =

Scientific classification
- Kingdom: Animalia
- Phylum: Arthropoda
- Clade: Pancrustacea
- Class: Insecta
- Order: Coleoptera
- Suborder: Polyphaga
- Infraorder: Scarabaeiformia
- Family: Scarabaeidae
- Genus: Ataenius
- Species: A. vinacoensis

Binomial name
- Ataenius vinacoensis Stebnicka, 2006

Species of beetle

Ataenius vinacoensis is a species of beetle of the family Scarabaeidae. It is found in Argentina.

== Description ==
Adults reach a length of about 4.5–4.8 mm (0.18–0.19 in). They have an elongate-oblong, subopaque, piceous black body, covered with a greasy coating.
