= Ataenius asper =

Scientific classification
- Kingdom: Animalia
- Phylum: Arthropoda
- Clade: Pancrustacea
- Class: Insecta
- Order: Coleoptera
- Suborder: Polyphaga
- Infraorder: Scarabaeiformia
- Family: Scarabaeidae
- Genus: Ataenius
- Species: A. asper

Binomial name
- Ataenius asper Petrovitz, 1975

Species of beetle

Ataenius asper is a species of beetle of the family Scarabaeidae. It is found in Australia (New South Wales, Queensland).

== Description ==
Adults reach a length of about 3.5–3.6 mm (0.14–0.14 in). They have an oblong-oval, moderately shining, piceous body, with short pubescence on the head, pronotum and apex of the elytra. The legs are dark brown and the club of the antennae is yellow.
