= Ataenius pseudostercorator =

Scientific classification
- Kingdom: Animalia
- Phylum: Arthropoda
- Clade: Pancrustacea
- Class: Insecta
- Order: Coleoptera
- Suborder: Polyphaga
- Infraorder: Scarabaeiformia
- Family: Scarabaeidae
- Genus: Ataenius
- Species: A. pseudostercorator

Binomial name
- Ataenius pseudostercorator Stebnicka, 2003

Species of beetle

Ataenius pseudostercorator is a species of beetle of the family Scarabaeidae. It is found in Bolivia and Brazil (Mato Grosso).

== Description ==
Adults reach a length of about 4.8–5.5 mm (0.19–0.22 in). They have an elongate, moderately convex, opaque, minutely setigerous body. The ground colour is brownish black, with the upper surface entirely encrusted by a yellowish grey argillaceous coating.
