= Ataenius insculptus =

Scientific classification
- Kingdom: Animalia
- Phylum: Arthropoda
- Clade: Pancrustacea
- Class: Insecta
- Order: Coleoptera
- Suborder: Polyphaga
- Infraorder: Scarabaeiformia
- Family: Scarabaeidae
- Genus: Ataenius
- Species: A. insculptus

Binomial name
- Ataenius insculptus Horn, 1887

Species of beetle

Ataenius insculptus is a species of aphodiine dung beetle in the family Scarabaeidae. It is found in the United States Alabama, (Florida, Mississippi, New Jersey, South Carolina).

== Description ==
Adults reach a length of about 3.8–4.8 mm (0.15–0.19 in). They have an oblong, convex, black and moderately shiny body.

== Life history ==
Specimens have been collected under deer droppings and under cow dung in a seepage areas in woods.
