= Ataenius sculptor =

Scientific classification
- Kingdom: Animalia
- Phylum: Arthropoda
- Clade: Pancrustacea
- Class: Insecta
- Order: Coleoptera
- Suborder: Polyphaga
- Infraorder: Scarabaeiformia
- Family: Scarabaeidae
- Genus: Ataenius
- Species: A. sculptor

Binomial name
- Ataenius sculptor Harold, 1868

Synonyms
- Ataenius oblongus Horn, 1871

Species of beetle

Ataenius sculptor is a species of beetle of the family Scarabaeidae. It is found in the United States (Arizona, California), Colombia, El Salvador, Guatemala, Honduras and Mexico (Chiapas, Guerrero, Jalisco, Morelos, Nayarit, Quintana Roo, Sinaloa, Sonora, Veracruz, Yucatán).

== Description ==
Adults reach a length of about 5.6–7 mm (0.22–0.28 in). They have an elongate-oblong, black, shiny and glabrous body.

== Life history ==
Specimens have been collected in excrements.
