= Ataenius carinatipennis =

Scientific classification
- Kingdom: Animalia
- Phylum: Arthropoda
- Clade: Pancrustacea
- Class: Insecta
- Order: Coleoptera
- Suborder: Polyphaga
- Infraorder: Scarabaeiformia
- Family: Scarabaeidae
- Genus: Ataenius
- Species: A. carinatipennis

Binomial name
- Ataenius carinatipennis Petrovitz, 1973

Synonyms
- Ataenius granulipennis Petrovitz, 1973

Species of beetle

Ataenius carinatipennis is a species of beetle of the family Scarabaeidae. It is found in Brazil (Paraíba, Piauí).

== Description ==
Adults reach a length of about 3–3.1 mm (0.12–0.12 in). They have an elongate-oval, minutely setigerous body, partially covered with a greyish coating. They are piceous, with the ventral surface brownish.
