= Ataenius cucutae =

Scientific classification
- Kingdom: Animalia
- Phylum: Arthropoda
- Clade: Pancrustacea
- Class: Insecta
- Order: Coleoptera
- Suborder: Polyphaga
- Infraorder: Scarabaeiformia
- Family: Scarabaeidae
- Genus: Ataenius
- Species: A. cucutae

Binomial name
- Ataenius cucutae Stebnicka, 2007

Species of beetle

Ataenius cucutae is a species of beetle of the family Scarabaeidae. It is found in Colombia and Ecuador.

== Description ==
Adults reach a length of about 2.8–3 mm (0.11–0.12 in). They have an elongate, shining, castaneous body.
