= Ataenius uriarrae =

Scientific classification
- Kingdom: Animalia
- Phylum: Arthropoda
- Clade: Pancrustacea
- Class: Insecta
- Order: Coleoptera
- Suborder: Polyphaga
- Infraorder: Scarabaeiformia
- Family: Scarabaeidae
- Genus: Ataenius
- Species: A. uriarrae

Binomial name
- Ataenius uriarrae Stebnicka & Howden, 1997

Species of beetle

Ataenius uriarrae is a species of beetle of the family Scarabaeidae. It is found in Australia (Australian Capital Territory, New South Wales).

== Description ==
Adults reach a length of about 4.2–4.9 mm (0.17–0.19 in). They have an oblong-oval, alutaceous, black body, partly covered with an argillaceous coating. The legs are reddish-brown.
