= Ataenius arrowi =

Scientific classification
- Kingdom: Animalia
- Phylum: Arthropoda
- Clade: Pancrustacea
- Class: Insecta
- Order: Coleoptera
- Suborder: Polyphaga
- Infraorder: Scarabaeiformia
- Family: Scarabaeidae
- Genus: Ataenius
- Species: A. arrowi

Binomial name
- Ataenius arrowi Hinton, 1936

Synonyms
- Ataenius leleupi Petrovitz, 1976

Species of beetle

Ataenius arrowi is a species of beetle of the family Scarabaeidae. It is found on the Galapagos Islands.

== Description ==
Adults reach a length of about 3.8–4.6 mm (0.15–0.18 in) for males and 3.9–4.8 mm (0.15–0.19 in) for females. A flightless morph of this species occurs in the pampa zone on the island of Santiago.

== Life history ==
Specimens have been collected in litter and in dung of tortoises, land iguanas and horses.
