= Ataenius impiger =

Scientific classification
- Kingdom: Animalia
- Phylum: Arthropoda
- Clade: Pancrustacea
- Class: Insecta
- Order: Coleoptera
- Suborder: Polyphaga
- Infraorder: Scarabaeiformia
- Family: Scarabaeidae
- Genus: Ataenius
- Species: A. impiger

Binomial name
- Ataenius impiger Schmidt, 1917

Synonyms
- Ataenius perpunctatus Balthasar, 1961; Ataenius laterigranulatus Balthasar, 1941

Species of beetle

Ataenius impiger is a species of beetle of the family Scarabaeidae. It is found in Argentina, Bolivia, Brazil (Amazonas, Distrito Federal, Mato Grosso, Mato Grosso do Sul, Minas Gerais, Rio de Janeiro, Rio Grande do Sul, Santa Catarina), Colombia, Paraguay, Peru and Venezuela.

== Description ==
Adults reach a length of about 4.1–5.2 mm (0.16–0.20 in). They have an oblong, piceous, moderately shiny to opaque body.

== Life history ==
Specimens have been collected in cattle droppings on pastures, in riverine forests, and in tropical humid forests.
