= Ataenius brevis =

Scientific classification
- Kingdom: Animalia
- Phylum: Arthropoda
- Clade: Pancrustacea
- Class: Insecta
- Order: Coleoptera
- Suborder: Polyphaga
- Infraorder: Scarabaeiformia
- Family: Scarabaeidae
- Genus: Ataenius
- Species: A. brevis

Binomial name
- Ataenius brevis Fall, 1930

Species of beetle

Ataenius brevis is a species of beetle of the family Scarabaeidae. It is found in the United States (Alabama, Georgia, Maryland, Massachusetts, New Hampshire, New York, North Carolina, Ohio, Pennsylvania, Rhode Island, South Carolina, Tennessee, Vermont, Virginia).

== Description ==
Adults reach a length of about 3.4–4.8 mm (0.13–0.19 in). They have a short oval, shiny black body, with the apex of the elytra and legs usually dark rufous.
