= Ataenius strigicauda =

Scientific classification
- Kingdom: Animalia
- Phylum: Arthropoda
- Clade: Pancrustacea
- Class: Insecta
- Order: Coleoptera
- Suborder: Polyphaga
- Infraorder: Scarabaeiformia
- Family: Scarabaeidae
- Genus: Ataenius
- Species: A. strigicauda

Binomial name
- Ataenius strigicauda Bates, 1887

Synonyms
- Ataenius strigicaudus Smith & Skelley, 2007; Ataenius aspericollis Petrovitz, 1973

Species of beetle

Ataenius strigicauda is a species of beetle of the family Scarabaeidae. It is found in Argentina, Bahamas, Barbados, Becquia, Bolivia, Brazil (Acre, Amazonas, Bahia, Espírito Santo, Goiás, Mato Grosso, Mato Grosso do Sul, Minas Gerais, Pará, Rio de Janeiro, Rio Grande do Sul, Rondônia, Roraima, Santa Catarina, São Paulo, Tocantins), Chile, Colombia, Costa Rica, Cuba, Dominican Republic, Ecuador, Grenada, Guadeloupe, Guatemala, Hispaniola, Honduras, Jamaica, Martinique, Mexico (Michoacán, Puebla, Veracruz), Nicaragua, Panama, Paraguay, Peru, Puerto Rico, Saint Croix, Saint Lucia, Saint Vincent, Trinidad & Tobago and the West Indies.

== Description ==
Adults reach a length of about 4.5–5.5 mm (0.18–0.22 in). They have a piceous to carbon black, more or less shining, and often distinctly microreticulate, subparallel-sided body.

== Life history ==
Specimens have been collected in cattle excrements.
