= Ataenius onkonensis =

Scientific classification
- Kingdom: Animalia
- Phylum: Arthropoda
- Clade: Pancrustacea
- Class: Insecta
- Order: Coleoptera
- Suborder: Polyphaga
- Infraorder: Scarabaeiformia
- Family: Scarabaeidae
- Genus: Ataenius
- Species: A. onkonensis

Binomial name
- Ataenius onkonensis Stebnicka, 2005

Species of beetle

Ataenius onkonensis is a species of beetle of the family Scarabaeidae. It is found in Ecuador.

== Description ==
Adults reach a length of about 3.9–4.3 mm (0.15–0.17 in). They have an oblong-oval, moderately convex, shining black body, with reddish-black legs.
