= Ataenius acutulus =

Scientific classification
- Kingdom: Animalia
- Phylum: Arthropoda
- Clade: Pancrustacea
- Class: Insecta
- Order: Coleoptera
- Suborder: Polyphaga
- Infraorder: Scarabaeiformia
- Family: Scarabaeidae
- Genus: Ataenius
- Species: A. acutulus

Binomial name
- Ataenius acutulus (Schmidt, 1914)

Synonyms
- Euparia acutula Schmidt, 1914

Species of beetle

Ataenius acutulus is a species of beetle of the family Scarabaeidae. It is found in Indonesia (Sumatra).

== Description ==
Adults reach a length of about 5.5–6.2 mm (0.22–0.24 in). They have an elongate-oval, black, slightly glossy body, the striae each bear a row of setiferous punctures.
