= Ataenius aequatorialis =

Scientific classification
- Kingdom: Animalia
- Phylum: Arthropoda
- Clade: Pancrustacea
- Class: Insecta
- Order: Coleoptera
- Suborder: Polyphaga
- Infraorder: Scarabaeiformia
- Family: Scarabaeidae
- Genus: Ataenius
- Species: A. aequatorialis

Binomial name
- Ataenius aequatorialis Petrovitz, 1961

Species of beetle

Ataenius aequatorialis is a species of beetle of the family Scarabaeidae. It is found on the Galapagos Islands and in Peru.

== Description ==
Adults reach a length of about 2.9–3.5 mm (0.11–0.14 in).

== Life history ==
Specimens have been collected in leaf litter, in rotting logs and in tortoise dung.
