= Ataenius klapperichi =

Scientific classification
- Kingdom: Animalia
- Phylum: Arthropoda
- Clade: Pancrustacea
- Class: Insecta
- Order: Coleoptera
- Suborder: Polyphaga
- Infraorder: Scarabaeiformia
- Family: Scarabaeidae
- Genus: Ataenius
- Species: A. klapperichi

Binomial name
- Ataenius klapperichi Howden, 1978

Species of beetle

Ataenius klapperichi is a species of beetle of the family Scarabaeidae. It is found in the Dominican Republic and Hispaniola.

== Description ==
Adults reach a length of about 4.2–4.4 mm (0.17–0.17 in). They have an oblong-oval, moderately convex, feebly shining, piceous body. The elytra are rough, and most elytral punctures have short, upright setae.
