= Ataenius gammonensis =

Scientific classification
- Kingdom: Animalia
- Phylum: Arthropoda
- Clade: Pancrustacea
- Class: Insecta
- Order: Coleoptera
- Suborder: Polyphaga
- Infraorder: Scarabaeiformia
- Family: Scarabaeidae
- Genus: Ataenius
- Species: A. gammonensis

Binomial name
- Ataenius gammonensis Stebnicka & Howden, 1997

Species of beetle

Ataenius gammonensis is a species of beetle of the family Scarabaeidae. It is found in Australia (South Australia).

== Description ==
Adults reach a length of about 3.7–4.2 mm (0.15–0.17 in). They have an oblong-oval, convex, shining, reddish-brown to reddish-black body, with the anterior of the clypeus, the legs and the ventral surface reddish. Sometimes, the posterior of the head and the pronotum are darker than the elytra.
