= Ataenius scabrellus =

Scientific classification
- Kingdom: Animalia
- Phylum: Arthropoda
- Clade: Pancrustacea
- Class: Insecta
- Order: Coleoptera
- Suborder: Polyphaga
- Infraorder: Scarabaeiformia
- Family: Scarabaeidae
- Genus: Ataenius
- Species: A. scabrellus

Binomial name
- Ataenius scabrellus Schmidt, 1909

Synonyms
- Ataenius fleutiauxi Paulian, 1947; Ataenius havanensis Balthasar, 1938

Species of beetle

Ataenius scabrellus is a species of beetle of the family Scarabaeidae. It is found in Cuba, the Bahamas, the Dominican Republic, Guadeloupe, Guyana, Jamaica, Puerto Rico, Saint Thomas, Venezuela and the United States (Florida).

== Description ==
Adults reach a length of about 3.5–4.2 mm (0.14–0.17 in). They have an elongate-oval, black or greyish black body.

== Life history ==
Specimens have been collected in coastal areas, freshwater marsh communities, in rain forests and orchard edges, under beach debris and amongst Casuarina needles.
