= Ataenius raslani =

Scientific classification
- Kingdom: Animalia
- Phylum: Arthropoda
- Clade: Pancrustacea
- Class: Insecta
- Order: Coleoptera
- Suborder: Polyphaga
- Infraorder: Scarabaeiformia
- Family: Scarabaeidae
- Genus: Ataenius
- Species: A. raslani

Binomial name
- Ataenius raslani Bordat & Théry, 2012

Species of beetle

Ataenius raslani is a species of beetle of the family Scarabaeidae. It is found in New Caledonia.

== Description ==
Adults reach a length of about 3.8–4.4 mm (0.15–0.17 in). They have a convex, dull, pubescent body. The head and pronotum are dark brown, and the margin of the clypeus and the anterior angles of the pronotum are reddish-brown. The elytra are dark brown, often with the bases of the intervals reddish-brown. The legs are reddish-brown.

== Etymology ==
The species is named in honour of Julien Raslan-Loubatié.
