= Ataenius erinaceus =

Scientific classification
- Kingdom: Animalia
- Phylum: Arthropoda
- Clade: Pancrustacea
- Class: Insecta
- Order: Coleoptera
- Suborder: Polyphaga
- Infraorder: Scarabaeiformia
- Family: Scarabaeidae
- Genus: Ataenius
- Species: A. erinaceus

Binomial name
- Ataenius erinaceus Petrovitz, 1961

Species of beetle

Ataenius erinaceus is a species of beetle of the family Scarabaeidae. It is found in Australia (Northern Territory, Queensland, Western Australia).

== Description ==
Adults reach a length of about 3.8–4 mm (0.15–0.16 in). They have an elongate, parallel-sided, weakly shining, finely setaceous, black body, with the anterior of the clypeus and the legs dark reddish-brown.
