= Ataenius napoensis =

Scientific classification
- Kingdom: Animalia
- Phylum: Arthropoda
- Clade: Pancrustacea
- Class: Insecta
- Order: Coleoptera
- Suborder: Polyphaga
- Infraorder: Scarabaeiformia
- Family: Scarabaeidae
- Genus: Ataenius
- Species: A. napoensis

Binomial name
- Ataenius napoensis Stebnicka, 2007

Species of beetle

Ataenius napoensis is a species of beetle of the family Scarabaeidae. It is found in Ecuador, Peru and Venezuela.

== Description ==
Adults reach a length of about 4.5–4.7 mm (0.18–0.19 in). They have a parallel-sided, carbon black body, which is weakly shining above.
