= Ataenius gascoyneensis =

Scientific classification
- Kingdom: Animalia
- Phylum: Arthropoda
- Clade: Pancrustacea
- Class: Insecta
- Order: Coleoptera
- Suborder: Polyphaga
- Infraorder: Scarabaeiformia
- Family: Scarabaeidae
- Genus: Ataenius
- Species: A. gascoyneensis

Binomial name
- Ataenius gascoyneensis Stebnicka & Howden, 1997

Species of beetle

Ataenius gascoyneensis is a species of beetle of the family Scarabaeidae. It is found in Australia (Western Australia).

== Description ==
Adults reach a length of about 3.8–3.9 mm (0.15–0.15 in). They have an elongate-oval, convex, slightly alutaceous, greyish black body.
