= Ataenius variopunctatus =

Scientific classification
- Kingdom: Animalia
- Phylum: Arthropoda
- Clade: Pancrustacea
- Class: Insecta
- Order: Coleoptera
- Suborder: Polyphaga
- Infraorder: Scarabaeiformia
- Family: Scarabaeidae
- Genus: Ataenius
- Species: A. variopunctatus

Binomial name
- Ataenius variopunctatus Schmidt, 1922

Species of beetle

Ataenius variopunctatus is a species of beetle of the family Scarabaeidae. It is found in Argentina.

== Description ==
Adults reach a length of about 4.9–5.2 mm (0.19–0.20 in). They have an elongate oblong, convex, moderately shiny, piceous black body, with the apex of the elytra reddish.
