= Ataenius abancay =

Scientific classification
- Kingdom: Animalia
- Phylum: Arthropoda
- Clade: Pancrustacea
- Class: Insecta
- Order: Coleoptera
- Suborder: Polyphaga
- Infraorder: Scarabaeiformia
- Family: Scarabaeidae
- Genus: Ataenius
- Species: A. abancay

Binomial name
- Ataenius abancay Stebnicka, 2005

Species of beetle

Ataenius abancay is a species of beetle of the family Scarabaeidae. It is found in Peru.

== Description ==
Adults reach a length of about 4–4.3 mm (0.16–0.17 in). They have an oblong, convex, shiny, piceous body, with the anterior of the clypeus and legs reddish.
