= Ataenius cristobalensis =

Scientific classification
- Kingdom: Animalia
- Phylum: Arthropoda
- Clade: Pancrustacea
- Class: Insecta
- Order: Coleoptera
- Suborder: Polyphaga
- Infraorder: Scarabaeiformia
- Family: Scarabaeidae
- Genus: Ataenius
- Species: A. cristobalensis

Binomial name
- Ataenius cristobalensis Cook & Peck, 2000

Species of beetle

Ataenius cristobalensis is a species of beetle of the family Scarabaeidae. It is found on the Galapagos Islands (San Cristobal).

== Description ==
Adults reach a length of about 4.4–5.2 mm (0.17–0.20 in). They have a moderately convex, shining, dark brown to black body, with the edge of the clypeus and legs dark reddish-brown and the antennae paler.

== Life history ==
Specimens have been collected in litter and horse dung.

== Etymology ==
The name of the species refers to the island of San Cristobal, where it occurs.
