= Ataenius koelleri =

Scientific classification
- Kingdom: Animalia
- Phylum: Arthropoda
- Clade: Pancrustacea
- Class: Insecta
- Order: Coleoptera
- Suborder: Polyphaga
- Infraorder: Scarabaeiformia
- Family: Scarabaeidae
- Genus: Ataenius
- Species: A. koelleri

Binomial name
- Ataenius koelleri Balthasar, 1963

Species of beetle

Ataenius koelleri is a species of beetle of the family Scarabaeidae. It is found in Bolivia, Brazil (Bahia, Distrito Federal, Mato Grosso, Pernambuco, Rondônia), Colombia, Panama, Paraguay, Suriname and Venezuela.

== Description ==
Adults reach a length of about 3.8–4.2 mm (0.15–0.17 in). They have an oblong-oval, moderately convex, strongly shiny, piceous black body, with the anterior of the clypeus and legs reddish.

== Life history ==
Specimens have been collected in wet montane forests.
