= Ataenius caicarae =

Scientific classification
- Kingdom: Animalia
- Phylum: Arthropoda
- Clade: Pancrustacea
- Class: Insecta
- Order: Coleoptera
- Suborder: Polyphaga
- Infraorder: Scarabaeiformia
- Family: Scarabaeidae
- Genus: Ataenius
- Species: A. caicarae

Binomial name
- Ataenius caicarae Stebnicka, 2005

Species of beetle

Ataenius caicarae is a species of beetle of the family Scarabaeidae. It is found in Venezuela.

== Description ==
Adults reach a length of about 2.1–3 mm (0.083–0.118 in). They have an oblong oval, medially strongly convex, shiny body. They are piceous with reddish legs.
