= Ataenius cylindrus =

Scientific classification
- Kingdom: Animalia
- Phylum: Arthropoda
- Clade: Pancrustacea
- Class: Insecta
- Order: Coleoptera
- Suborder: Polyphaga
- Infraorder: Scarabaeiformia
- Family: Scarabaeidae
- Genus: Ataenius
- Species: A. cylindrus

Binomial name
- Ataenius cylindrus Horn, 1871

Synonyms
- Ataenius horni Harold, 1874

Species of beetle

Ataenius cylindrus is a species of beetle of the family Scarabaeidae. It is found in the United States (Alabama, Florida, Kentucky, Louisiana, Maryland, Mississippi, New Yersey, North Carolina, Pennsylvania, South Carolina, Tennessee, Texas, Virginia).

== Description ==
Adults reach a length of about 3.3–4 mm (0.13–0.16 in). They have an oblong, convex, moderately shining, black body.

== Life history ==
Specimens have been collected in half dry cow dung, but also on the dry ground surface under excrements.
