= Ataenius semicoecus =

Scientific classification
- Kingdom: Animalia
- Phylum: Arthropoda
- Clade: Pancrustacea
- Class: Insecta
- Order: Coleoptera
- Suborder: Polyphaga
- Infraorder: Scarabaeiformia
- Family: Scarabaeidae
- Genus: Ataenius
- Species: A. semicoecus

Binomial name
- Ataenius semicoecus (MacLeay, 1888)

Synonyms
- Ammoecius semicoecus MacLeay, 1888; Ataenius demarzi Petrovitz, 1961; Ataenius laevifrons Lea, 1923

Species of beetle

Ataenius semicoecus is a species of beetle of the family Scarabaeidae. It is found in Australia (Northern Territory, Queensland, Western Australia).

== Description ==
Adults reach a length of about 4–5.5 mm (0.16–0.22 in). They have an oblong-oval, slightly convex and alutaceous, piceous, reddish-black or reddish-brown body.
