= Ataenius guriensis =

Scientific classification
- Kingdom: Animalia
- Phylum: Arthropoda
- Clade: Pancrustacea
- Class: Insecta
- Order: Coleoptera
- Suborder: Polyphaga
- Infraorder: Scarabaeiformia
- Family: Scarabaeidae
- Genus: Ataenius
- Species: A. guriensis

Binomial name
- Ataenius guriensis Stebnicka, 2005

Species of beetle

Ataenius guriensis is a species of beetle of the family Scarabaeidae. It is found in Venezuela.

== Description ==
Adults reach a length of about 3.8–4.2 mm (0.15–0.17 in). They have an oblong-oval, convex, moderately shiny, piceous or rarely dark brown body.
