= Ataenius complicatus =

Scientific classification
- Kingdom: Animalia
- Phylum: Arthropoda
- Clade: Pancrustacea
- Class: Insecta
- Order: Coleoptera
- Suborder: Polyphaga
- Infraorder: Scarabaeiformia
- Family: Scarabaeidae
- Genus: Ataenius
- Species: A. complicatus

Binomial name
- Ataenius complicatus Harold, 1869

Synonyms
- Ataenius lorettii Martinez, 1952

Species of beetle

Ataenius complicatus is a species of beetle of the family Scarabaeidae. It is found in Argentina, Belize, Bolivia, Brazil (Amazonas, Bahia, Distrito Federal, Espírito Santo, Mato Grosso, Mato Grosso do Sul, Minas Gerais, Pará, Paraíba, Pernambuco, Piauí, Rio de Janeiro, Rio Grande do Norte, São Paulo), Colombia, Costa Rica, El Salvador, Guatemala, Honduras, Mexico (Campeche, Chiapas, Guerrero, Hidalgo, Jalisco, Oaxaca, Quintana Roo, Veracruz), Nicaragua, Panama, Paraguay, Peru, Venezuela and on Curaçao.

== Description ==
Adults reach a length of about 5–7 mm (0.20–0.28 in). They have an elongate-oblong, moderately shiny, partly setaceous, piceous black body.

== Life history ==
Specimens have been collected in cattle dung on pastures, as well as in dry tropical forests.
