= Ataenius bolivarensis =

Scientific classification
- Kingdom: Animalia
- Phylum: Arthropoda
- Clade: Pancrustacea
- Class: Insecta
- Order: Coleoptera
- Suborder: Polyphaga
- Infraorder: Scarabaeiformia
- Family: Scarabaeidae
- Genus: Ataenius
- Species: A. bolivarensis

Binomial name
- Ataenius bolivarensis Stebnicka, 2007

Species of beetle

Ataenius bolivarensis is a species of beetle of the family Scarabaeidae. It is found in Brazil (Mato Grosso do Sul), Guyana and Venezuela.

== Description ==
Adults reach a length of about 3.7–4 mm (0.15–0.16 in). They have an oblong oval, alutaceous, partly setaceous, piceous body, with the anterior of the clypeus reddish and the legs dark brown.
