= Ataenius australis =

Scientific classification
- Kingdom: Animalia
- Phylum: Arthropoda
- Clade: Pancrustacea
- Class: Insecta
- Order: Coleoptera
- Suborder: Polyphaga
- Infraorder: Scarabaeiformia
- Family: Scarabaeidae
- Genus: Ataenius
- Species: A. australis

Binomial name
- Ataenius australis Harold, 1875

Species of beetle

Ataenius australis is a species of beetle of the family Scarabaeidae. It is found in Australia (Australian Capital Territory, New South Wales, Western Australia, South Australia).

== Description ==
Adults reach a length of about 4–4.5 mm (0.16–0.18 in). They have an elongate, parallel-sided, alutaceous, reddish-black to black body, with the anterior of the clypeus reddish.
