= Ataenius howdeni =

Scientific classification
- Kingdom: Animalia
- Phylum: Arthropoda
- Clade: Pancrustacea
- Class: Insecta
- Order: Coleoptera
- Suborder: Polyphaga
- Infraorder: Scarabaeiformia
- Family: Scarabaeidae
- Genus: Ataenius
- Species: A. howdeni

Binomial name
- Ataenius howdeni Chalumeau, 1978

Species of beetle

Ataenius howdeni is a species of beetle of the family Scarabaeidae. It is found on Antigua.

== Description ==
Adults reach a length of about 4 mm (0.16 in). They have a dark brown body, with the elytra lighter than the fore body and with the lateral and apical area yellowish.
