= Ataenius monteithi =

Scientific classification
- Kingdom: Animalia
- Phylum: Arthropoda
- Clade: Pancrustacea
- Class: Insecta
- Order: Coleoptera
- Suborder: Polyphaga
- Infraorder: Scarabaeiformia
- Family: Scarabaeidae
- Genus: Ataenius
- Species: A. monteithi

Binomial name
- Ataenius monteithi Paulian, 1991

Species of beetle

Ataenius monteithi is a species of beetle of the family Scarabaeidae. It is found in New Caledonia.

== Description ==
Adults reach a length of about 3.8–5 mm (0.15–0.20 in). The integument is dull, finely reticulated on the head and pronotum, but more strongly on the elytra. The legs are dark reddish-brown.
