= Ataenius jardinensis =

Scientific classification
- Kingdom: Animalia
- Phylum: Arthropoda
- Clade: Pancrustacea
- Class: Insecta
- Order: Coleoptera
- Suborder: Polyphaga
- Infraorder: Scarabaeiformia
- Family: Scarabaeidae
- Genus: Ataenius
- Species: A. jardinensis

Binomial name
- Ataenius jardinensis Stebnicka, 2002

Species of beetle

Ataenius jardinensis is a species of beetle of the family Scarabaeidae. It is found in Cuba.

== Description ==
Adults reach a length of about 3.8–4 mm (0.15–0.16 in). They have an oblong-oval, piceous black, moderately shining body, with the legs reddish black.
