= Ataenius australasiae =

Scientific classification
- Kingdom: Animalia
- Phylum: Arthropoda
- Clade: Pancrustacea
- Class: Insecta
- Order: Coleoptera
- Suborder: Polyphaga
- Infraorder: Scarabaeiformia
- Family: Scarabaeidae
- Genus: Ataenius
- Species: A. australasiae

Binomial name
- Ataenius australasiae (Boheman, 1858)

Synonyms
- Aphodius australasiae Boheman, 1858; Ataenius malayianus Petrovitz, 1961; Ataenius malayianus rufus Petrovitz, 1961; Ataenius okinawensis Nakane, 1960; Ataenius fukiensis Balthasar, 1942; Ataenius tweedensis Blackburn, 1904; Aphodius gestroi Harold, 1877; Aphodius cancelliventris Motschulsky, 1858; Aphodius castanicolor Motschulsky, 1858

Species of beetle

Ataenius australasiae is a species of beetle of the family Scarabaeidae. It is found in Australia (Australian Capital Territory, New South Wales, Northern Territory, Queensland, Western Australia, South Australia), Papua New Guinea, China (Fujian, Hainan), Japan, Indonesia (Java, Sumatra, Sulawesi, Bali, Irian Jaya), Malaysia (Sabah), Myanmar, the Philippines (Leyte), Thailand and Vietnam.

== Description ==
Adults reach a length of about 3.8–5.5 mm (0.15–0.22 in). They have an oblong-oval, convex, shining, black, reddish-black or reddish-brown body.
