= Ataenius seaforthensis =

Scientific classification
- Kingdom: Animalia
- Phylum: Arthropoda
- Clade: Pancrustacea
- Class: Insecta
- Order: Coleoptera
- Suborder: Polyphaga
- Infraorder: Scarabaeiformia
- Family: Scarabaeidae
- Genus: Ataenius
- Species: A. seaforthensis

Binomial name
- Ataenius seaforthensis Stebnicka & Howden, 1997

Species of beetle

Ataenius seaforthensis is a species of beetle of the family Scarabaeidae. It is found in Australia (Queensland).

== Description ==
Adults reach a length of about 3.2–3.5 mm (0.13–0.14 in). They have an oblong-oval, moderately shining, reddish-brown to dark brown body, with short pubescence on the head, pronotum and apex of the elytra. The legs are reddish and the club of the antennae is yellow.
