= Ataenius freyi =

Scientific classification
- Kingdom: Animalia
- Phylum: Arthropoda
- Clade: Pancrustacea
- Class: Insecta
- Order: Coleoptera
- Suborder: Polyphaga
- Infraorder: Scarabaeiformia
- Family: Scarabaeidae
- Genus: Ataenius
- Species: A. freyi

Binomial name
- Ataenius freyi Petrovitz, 1961

Species of beetle

Ataenius freyi is a species of beetle of the family Scarabaeidae. It is found in Australia (Queensland, Northern Territory, Western Australia).

== Description ==
Adults reach a length of about 4–4.8 mm (0.16–0.19 in). They have an oblong-oval, convex, alutaceous, slightly shining to opaque, glabrous, reddish-black to black or reddish-brown body.
