= Ataenius peregrinator =

Scientific classification
- Kingdom: Animalia
- Phylum: Arthropoda
- Clade: Pancrustacea
- Class: Insecta
- Order: Coleoptera
- Suborder: Polyphaga
- Infraorder: Scarabaeiformia
- Family: Scarabaeidae
- Genus: Ataenius
- Species: A. peregrinator

Binomial name
- Ataenius peregrinator Harold, 1877

Synonyms
- Ataenius gutierrezi Paulian, 1991; Ataenius nunenmacheri Cartwright, 1974; Ataenius stroheckeri Cartwright, 1974; Ataenius sumatrensis Balthasar, 1941; Saprosites clypealis Lea, 1923; Ataenius polyglyptus hieronymi Bates, 1887

Species of beetle

Ataenius peregrinator is a species of beetle of the family Scarabaeidae. It is found in Australia (Christmas Island, Queensland), New Caledonia, Indonesia (Sumatra, Java, Bali, Sulawesi), Malaysia (Sabah), the Philippines, Thailand, Vietnam, Fiji, Japan, Belize, Guatemala, Honduras, Mexico (Chiapas, Sinaloa, Oaxaca, Veracruz), Panama, and the United States (Arizona, Florida).

== Description ==
Adults reach a length of about 2.8–3.5 mm (0.11–0.14 in). They have a convex, glabrous, shiny, brownish-black to dark reddish-brown body, with the elytra elongated and with the anterior margin of the head and the anterior angles of the pronotum reddish. The legs are reddish-brown.
