= Ataenius brevitarsis =

Scientific classification
- Kingdom: Animalia
- Phylum: Arthropoda
- Clade: Pancrustacea
- Class: Insecta
- Order: Coleoptera
- Suborder: Polyphaga
- Infraorder: Scarabaeiformia
- Family: Scarabaeidae
- Genus: Ataenius
- Species: A. brevitarsis

Binomial name
- Ataenius brevitarsis Petrovitz, 1964

Species of beetle

Ataenius brevitarsis is a species of beetle of the family Scarabaeidae. It is found in Australia (New South Wales).

== Description ==
Adults reach a length of about 3.5–3.8 mm (0.14–0.15 in). They have an elongate-oval, convex, slightly shining, partly setaceous, black or reddish-black body, with the anterior of the clypeus and legs reddish.
