= Ataenius nudus =

Scientific classification
- Kingdom: Animalia
- Phylum: Arthropoda
- Clade: Pancrustacea
- Class: Insecta
- Order: Coleoptera
- Suborder: Polyphaga
- Infraorder: Scarabaeiformia
- Family: Scarabaeidae
- Genus: Ataenius
- Species: A. nudus

Binomial name
- Ataenius nudus Blackburn, 1904

Synonyms
- Saprosites australis Petrovitz, 1958

Species of beetle

Ataenius nudus is a species of beetle of the family Scarabaeidae. It is found in Australia (Western Australia).

== Description ==
Adults reach a length of about 3.5–4.5 mm (0.14–0.18 in). They have an elongate, parallel-sided, moderately convex, shining, reddish-black to black body, with the margin of the clypeus and anterior angles of the pronotum reddish, and mostly with the abdomen also reddish.
