= Ataenius saulensis =

Scientific classification
- Kingdom: Animalia
- Phylum: Arthropoda
- Clade: Pancrustacea
- Class: Insecta
- Order: Coleoptera
- Suborder: Polyphaga
- Infraorder: Scarabaeiformia
- Family: Scarabaeidae
- Genus: Ataenius
- Species: A. saulensis

Binomial name
- Ataenius saulensis Stebnicka, 2006

Species of beetle

Ataenius saulensis is a species of beetle of the family Scarabaeidae. It is found in French Guiana.

== Description ==
Adults reach a length of about 3.8–4 mm (0.15–0.16 in). They have an oblong, convex, dark brown to piceous, glabrous, weakly shiny body, with the venter lighter than the upper surface.
