= Ataenius petrovitzi =

Scientific classification
- Kingdom: Animalia
- Phylum: Arthropoda
- Clade: Pancrustacea
- Class: Insecta
- Order: Coleoptera
- Suborder: Polyphaga
- Infraorder: Scarabaeiformia
- Family: Scarabaeidae
- Genus: Ataenius
- Species: A. petrovitzi

Binomial name
- Ataenius petrovitzi Balthasar, 1960

Species of beetle

Ataenius petrovitzi is a species of beetle of the family Scarabaeidae. It is found in Argentina, Bolivia, Brazil (Amazonas, Mato Grosso, Mato Grosso do Sul, Rondônia, Roraima), Colombia, Ecuador, Paraguay and Peru.

== Description ==
Adults reach a length of about 3–4 mm (0.12–0.16 in). They have a parallel-sided, piceous or brownish body, with the upper surface entirely and tightly covered with an olivaceous or greyish argillaceous coating.
