= Ataenius garamas =

Scientific classification
- Kingdom: Animalia
- Phylum: Arthropoda
- Clade: Pancrustacea
- Class: Insecta
- Order: Coleoptera
- Suborder: Polyphaga
- Infraorder: Scarabaeiformia
- Family: Scarabaeidae
- Genus: Ataenius
- Species: A. garamas

Binomial name
- Ataenius garamas Peyerimhoff, 1929

Synonyms
- Ataenius kratochwili gracilioides Endrödi, 1960; Saprosites basilewskyi Endrödi, 1955; Pleurophorus alticola Villiers, 1950; Ataenius gracilis morogorensis Balthasar, 1947; Ataenius kratochvili Balthasar, 1942

Species of beetle

Ataenius garamas is a species of beetle of the family Scarabaeidae. It is found in Algeria, Saudi Arabia, the United Arab Emirates, Madagascar, Ghana, Ivory Coast, the Democratic Republic of the Congo, the Republic of the Congo, Rwanda and Tanzania.

== Description ==
Adults reach a length of about 2.5 mm (0.098 in). They have an elongate, parallel-sided, glossy, reddish-brown body.
