= Ataenius walterhorni =

Scientific classification
- Kingdom: Animalia
- Phylum: Arthropoda
- Clade: Pancrustacea
- Class: Insecta
- Order: Coleoptera
- Suborder: Polyphaga
- Infraorder: Scarabaeiformia
- Family: Scarabaeidae
- Genus: Ataenius
- Species: A. walterhorni

Binomial name
- Ataenius walterhorni Balthasar, 1938

Species of beetle

Ataenius walterhorni is a species of beetle of the family Scarabaeidae. It is found in Cuba and the United States (Florida, Louisiana, Pennsylvania).

== Description ==
Adults reach a length of about 3.8–4.8 mm (0.15–0.19 in). They have an elongate-oblong, moderately shining, brown, dark castaneous or brownish black body.
