= Ataenius castaniellus =

Scientific classification
- Kingdom: Animalia
- Phylum: Arthropoda
- Clade: Pancrustacea
- Class: Insecta
- Order: Coleoptera
- Suborder: Polyphaga
- Infraorder: Scarabaeiformia
- Family: Scarabaeidae
- Genus: Ataenius
- Species: A. castaniellus

Binomial name
- Ataenius castaniellus Bates, 1887

Synonyms
- Ataenius liogaster castaniellus Bates, 1887

Species of beetle

Ataenius castaniellus is a species of beetle of the family Scarabaeidae. It is found in El Salvador, Guatemala, Honduras and Mexico (Hidalgo, Oaxaca, Puebla, Tamaulipas, Veracruz).

== Description ==
Adults reach a length of about 4–5 mm (0.16–0.20 in). They have an elongate oblong, moderately convex, dark castaneous and shining body.

== Life history ==
Specimens have been collected in dry cattle excrements.
