= Ataenius vethianus =

Scientific classification
- Kingdom: Animalia
- Phylum: Arthropoda
- Clade: Pancrustacea
- Class: Insecta
- Order: Coleoptera
- Suborder: Polyphaga
- Infraorder: Scarabaeiformia
- Family: Scarabaeidae
- Genus: Ataenius
- Species: A. vethianus

Binomial name
- Ataenius vethianus Schmidt, 1909

Species of beetle

Ataenius vethianus is a species of beetle of the family Scarabaeidae. It is found in Indonesia (Sumatra).

== Description ==
Adults reach a length of about 3–3.5 mm (0.12–0.14 in). They have an elongate, rather flatly convex, glossy, blackish-brown body.
