= Ataenius californicus =

Scientific classification
- Kingdom: Animalia
- Phylum: Arthropoda
- Clade: Pancrustacea
- Class: Insecta
- Order: Coleoptera
- Suborder: Polyphaga
- Infraorder: Scarabaeiformia
- Family: Scarabaeidae
- Genus: Ataenius
- Species: A. californicus

Binomial name
- Ataenius californicus Horn, 1887

Species of beetle

Ataenius californicus is a species of beetle of the family Scarabaeidae. It is found in the United States (Arizona, California, Utah).

== Description ==
Adults reach a length of about 3.8–5.3 mm (0.15–0.21 in). They have an elongate-oblong, parallel, shiny rufo-piceous to piceous body, with rufous legs.

== Life history ==
Specimens have been collected in animal dung, but have also been recorded feeding on fly larvae and the roots of sugar beets.
