= Ataenius synnotensis =

Scientific classification
- Kingdom: Animalia
- Phylum: Arthropoda
- Clade: Pancrustacea
- Class: Insecta
- Order: Coleoptera
- Suborder: Polyphaga
- Infraorder: Scarabaeiformia
- Family: Scarabaeidae
- Genus: Ataenius
- Species: A. synnotensis

Binomial name
- Ataenius synnotensis Stebnicka & Howden, 1997

Species of beetle

Ataenius synnotensis is a species of beetle of the family Scarabaeidae. It is found in Australia (Western Australia).

== Description ==
Adults reach a length of about 4.8–5.2 mm (0.19–0.20 in). They have an oblong-oval, convex, alutaceous, slightly shining, glabrous, reddish-black to black body, with the anterior edge of the clypeus reddish.
