= Ataenius deserti =

Scientific classification
- Kingdom: Animalia
- Phylum: Arthropoda
- Clade: Pancrustacea
- Class: Insecta
- Order: Coleoptera
- Suborder: Polyphaga
- Infraorder: Scarabaeiformia
- Family: Scarabaeidae
- Genus: Ataenius
- Species: A. deserti

Binomial name
- Ataenius deserti Blackburn, 1894

Synonyms
- Ataenius katherinei Petrovitz, 1961

Species of beetle

Ataenius deserti is a species of beetle of the family Scarabaeidae. It is found in Australia (Northern Territory, Queensland) and Papua New Guinea.

== Description ==
Adults reach a length of about 3–3.5 mm (0.12–0.14 in). They have an elongate-oval, black body, with the anterior margin of the clypeus and the legs reddish. The dorsal surface is glabrous.
