= Ataenius strigifrons =

Scientific classification
- Kingdom: Animalia
- Phylum: Arthropoda
- Clade: Pancrustacea
- Class: Insecta
- Order: Coleoptera
- Suborder: Polyphaga
- Infraorder: Scarabaeiformia
- Family: Scarabaeidae
- Genus: Ataenius
- Species: A. strigifrons

Binomial name
- Ataenius strigifrons Schmidt, 1920

Species of beetle

Ataenius strigifrons is a species of beetle of the family Scarabaeidae. It is found in Australia (Northern Territory, Queensland, New South Wales, Norfolk Island).

== Description ==
Adults reach a length of about 3.8–5 mm (0.15–0.20 in). They have an elongate-oval, convex, slightly shining, brownish-black or greyish-black body, which is usually covered with an argillaceous coating. The anterior of the clypeus and the legs are reddish-brown.
