= Ataenius siminasus =

Scientific classification
- Kingdom: Animalia
- Phylum: Arthropoda
- Clade: Pancrustacea
- Class: Insecta
- Order: Coleoptera
- Suborder: Polyphaga
- Infraorder: Scarabaeiformia
- Family: Scarabaeidae
- Genus: Ataenius
- Species: A. siminasus

Binomial name
- Ataenius siminasus Petrovitz, 1973

Species of beetle

Ataenius siminasus is a species of beetle of the family Scarabaeidae. It is found in Brazil (Amazonas) and Peru.

== Description ==
Adults reach a length of about 3–3.2 mm (0.12–0.13 in). They have an elongate-oval, minutely setigerous body, tightly covered with a greyish argillaceous coating.
