= Ataenius catarinaensis =

Scientific classification
- Kingdom: Animalia
- Phylum: Arthropoda
- Clade: Pancrustacea
- Class: Insecta
- Order: Coleoptera
- Suborder: Polyphaga
- Infraorder: Scarabaeiformia
- Family: Scarabaeidae
- Genus: Ataenius
- Species: A. catarinaensis

Binomial name
- Ataenius catarinaensis Stebnicka, 2007

Species of beetle

Ataenius catarinaensis is a species of beetle of the family Scarabaeidae. It is found in Brazil (Rio de Janeiro, Santa Catarina) and Paraguay.

== Description ==
Adults reach a length of about 3.5–3.8 mm (0.14–0.15 in). They have a parallel-sided, alutaceous, piceous to black body, with the anterior of the clypeus and legs reddish brown. They are weakly shining above.
