= Ataenius stercorator =

Scientific classification
- Kingdom: Animalia
- Phylum: Arthropoda
- Clade: Pancrustacea
- Class: Insecta
- Order: Coleoptera
- Suborder: Polyphaga
- Infraorder: Scarabaeiformia
- Family: Scarabaeidae
- Genus: Ataenius
- Species: A. stercorator

Binomial name
- Ataenius stercorator (Fabricius, 1775)

Synonyms
- Scarabaeus stercorator Fabricius, 1775; Ataenius opacus Harold, 1867; Oxyomus bonariensis Dejean, 1833

Species of beetle

Ataenius stercorator is a species of beetle of the family Scarabaeidae. It is found in Argentina, Bolivia, Brazil (Amapá, Amazonas, Bahia, Espírito Santo, Mato Grosso, Mato Grosso do Sul, Minas Gerais, Pará, Paraná, Rio de Janeiro, Rio Grande do Sul, Santa Catarina, São Paulo, Tocantins), Paraguay, Uruguay and possibly Suriname.

== Description ==
Adults reach a length of about 5–6 mm (0.20–0.24 in). They have a sooty-black, slightly opalescent, glabrous, uncoated body.

== Life history ==
Specimens have been collected in bovine dung on wet grassland and pastures.
