= Ataenius angulatus =

Scientific classification
- Kingdom: Animalia
- Phylum: Arthropoda
- Clade: Pancrustacea
- Class: Insecta
- Order: Coleoptera
- Suborder: Polyphaga
- Infraorder: Scarabaeiformia
- Family: Scarabaeidae
- Genus: Ataenius
- Species: A. angulatus

Binomial name
- Ataenius angulatus Petrovitz, 1964

Species of beetle

Ataenius angulatus is a species of beetle of the family Scarabaeidae. It is found in Australia (Queensland).

== Description ==
Adults reach a length of about 4–4.5 mm (0.16–0.18 in). They have an elongate, almost parallel, opaque, setaceous, greyish black body, usually covered with an argillaceous coating. The legs are reddish-brown.
