= Ataenius desertus =

Scientific classification
- Kingdom: Animalia
- Phylum: Arthropoda
- Clade: Pancrustacea
- Class: Insecta
- Order: Coleoptera
- Suborder: Polyphaga
- Infraorder: Scarabaeiformia
- Family: Scarabaeidae
- Genus: Ataenius
- Species: A. desertus

Binomial name
- Ataenius desertus Horn, 1871

Species of beetle

Ataenius desertus is a species of aphodiine dung beetle in the family Scarabaeidae. It is found in the United States (Arizona, California, Kansas, Nevada, New Mexico, Texas, Utah) and Mexico (Baja California Sur, Durango, Sonora).

== Description ==
Adults reach a length of about 3.3–4.5 mm (0.13–0.18 in). They have an oblong, shiny, orange or rusty brown body.
