= Ataenius noques =

Scientific classification
- Kingdom: Animalia
- Phylum: Arthropoda
- Clade: Pancrustacea
- Class: Insecta
- Order: Coleoptera
- Suborder: Polyphaga
- Infraorder: Scarabaeiformia
- Family: Scarabaeidae
- Genus: Ataenius
- Species: A. noques

Binomial name
- Ataenius noques Stebnicka, 2007

Species of beetle

Ataenius noques is a species of beetle of the family Scarabaeidae. It is found in Argentina, Brazil (Goiás, Minas Gerais, São Paulo) and Paraguay.

== Description ==
Adults reach a length of about 3.8–4 mm (0.15–0.16 in). They have an elongate, parallel-sided, weakly shining, dark brown to piceous body, with the legs dark brown.
