= Ataenius torridus =

Scientific classification
- Kingdom: Animalia
- Phylum: Arthropoda
- Clade: Pancrustacea
- Class: Insecta
- Order: Coleoptera
- Suborder: Polyphaga
- Infraorder: Scarabaeiformia
- Family: Scarabaeidae
- Genus: Ataenius
- Species: A. torridus

Binomial name
- Ataenius torridus Blackburn, 1892

Synonyms
- Ataenius thoracicus Petrovitz, 1971; Ataenius setipennis Petrovitz, 1961

Species of beetle

Ataenius torridus is a species of beetle of the family Scarabaeidae. It is found in Australia (Northern Territory, Queensland, Western Australia).

== Description ==
Adults reach a length of about 2.8–3.2 mm (0.11–0.13 in). They have an elongate, shining, rusty brown, dark brown, reddish-black or black body, often with the elytra lighter than the head and pronotum. The dorsal surface is glabrous. In some specimens, the elytra are a bit alutaceous and in dark specimens, the anterior of the clypeus and legs are reddish.
