= Ataenius crenatipennis =

Scientific classification
- Kingdom: Animalia
- Phylum: Arthropoda
- Clade: Pancrustacea
- Class: Insecta
- Order: Coleoptera
- Suborder: Polyphaga
- Infraorder: Scarabaeiformia
- Family: Scarabaeidae
- Genus: Ataenius
- Species: A. crenatipennis

Binomial name
- Ataenius crenatipennis (MacLeay, 1871)

Synonyms
- Ammoecius crenatipennis MacLeay, 1871

Species of beetle

Ataenius crenatipennis is a species of beetle of the family Scarabaeidae. It is found in Australia (Queensland).

== Description ==
Adults reach a length of about 4–4.2 mm (0.16–0.17 in). They have an oblong-oval, convex, slightly shining, glabrous, black body, with the anterior of the clypeus and legs reddish-brown.
