= Ataenius peregianensis =

Scientific classification
- Kingdom: Animalia
- Phylum: Arthropoda
- Clade: Pancrustacea
- Class: Insecta
- Order: Coleoptera
- Suborder: Polyphaga
- Infraorder: Scarabaeiformia
- Family: Scarabaeidae
- Genus: Ataenius
- Species: A. peregianensis

Binomial name
- Ataenius peregianensis Stebnicka & Howden, 1997

Species of beetle

Ataenius peregianensis is a species of beetle of the family Scarabaeidae. It is found in Australia (Queensland).

== Description ==
Adults reach a length of about 3–3.1 mm (0.12–0.12 in). They have an elongate-oval, alutaceous, sub-opaque, brownish-black body, with the anterior of the clypeus and legs reddish-brown. The dorsal surface is glabrous.
