= Ataenius fattigi =

Scientific classification
- Kingdom: Animalia
- Phylum: Arthropoda
- Clade: Pancrustacea
- Class: Insecta
- Order: Coleoptera
- Suborder: Polyphaga
- Infraorder: Scarabaeiformia
- Family: Scarabaeidae
- Genus: Ataenius
- Species: A. fattigi

Binomial name
- Ataenius fattigi Cartwright, 1948

Species of beetle

Ataenius fattigi is a species of aphodiine dung beetle in the family Scarabaeidae. It is found in the United States (Georgia, Florida, Maryland, Michigan, Mississippi, New Jersey, South Carolina, Texas, West Virginia, Wisconsin).

== Description ==
Adults reach a length of about 4.8–6 mm (0.19–0.24 in). They have an oblong, shiny black body, with the legs usually brownish-piceous.

== Life history ==
Specimens have been collected in cow dung and in surface litter.
