= Ataenius borneensis =

Scientific classification
- Kingdom: Animalia
- Phylum: Arthropoda
- Clade: Pancrustacea
- Class: Insecta
- Order: Coleoptera
- Suborder: Polyphaga
- Infraorder: Scarabaeiformia
- Family: Scarabaeidae
- Genus: Ataenius
- Species: A. borneensis

Binomial name
- Ataenius borneensis Minkina & Bellmann, 2023

Species of beetle

Ataenius borneensis is a species of beetle of the family Scarabaeidae. It is found in Malaysia (Sabah).

== Description ==
Adults reach a length of about 4.1 mm (0.16 in). They have an elongate, convex, shiny, light brownish body, with the tarsi and antennae yellowish.

== Etymology ==
The species is named after Borneo, where the type specimen was collected.
