= Ataenius atramentarius =

Scientific classification
- Kingdom: Animalia
- Phylum: Arthropoda
- Clade: Pancrustacea
- Class: Insecta
- Order: Coleoptera
- Suborder: Polyphaga
- Infraorder: Scarabaeiformia
- Family: Scarabaeidae
- Genus: Ataenius
- Species: A. atramentarius

Binomial name
- Ataenius atramentarius (Erichson, 1847)

Synonyms
- Euparia atramentaria Erichson, 1847; Ataenius dampieri Petrovitz, 1961

Species of beetle

Ataenius atramentarius is a species of beetle of the family Scarabaeidae. It is found in Ecuador and Peru and on the Galapagos Islands.

== Description ==
Adults reach a length of about 4.5–5.2 mm (0.18–0.20 in). They have a shining, carbon black body.

== Life history ==
Specimens have been collected in premontane moist forests. Specimens from the Galapagos Islands were found in the arid zone in leaf litter, in tortoise pens and in cow dung.
