= Ataenius lobatus =

Scientific classification
- Kingdom: Animalia
- Phylum: Arthropoda
- Clade: Pancrustacea
- Class: Insecta
- Order: Coleoptera
- Suborder: Polyphaga
- Infraorder: Scarabaeiformia
- Family: Scarabaeidae
- Genus: Ataenius
- Species: A. lobatus

Binomial name
- Ataenius lobatus Horn, 1871

Synonyms
- Ataenius laeviventris Horn, 1887

Species of beetle

Ataenius lobatus is a species of beetle of the family Scarabaeidae. It is found in the United States (Arizona, California, Nevada, Texas) and Mexico (Baja California, Baja California Sur, Sonora).

== Description ==
Adults reach a length of about 4.5–6 mm (0.18–0.24 in). They have an elongate oblong, moderately convex, shining, dark castaneous to black body.
