= Ataenius skelleyi =

Scientific classification
- Kingdom: Animalia
- Phylum: Arthropoda
- Clade: Pancrustacea
- Class: Insecta
- Order: Coleoptera
- Suborder: Polyphaga
- Infraorder: Scarabaeiformia
- Family: Scarabaeidae
- Genus: Ataenius
- Species: A. skelleyi

Binomial name
- Ataenius skelleyi Stebnicka, 2007

Species of beetle

Ataenius skelleyi is a species of beetle of the family Scarabaeidae. It is found in Brazil (Rondônia) and Venezuela.

== Description ==
Adults reach a length of about 4–4.5 mm (0.16–0.18 in). They have an alutaceous, dark brown to piceous body, with the legs reddish brown.

== Etymology ==
The species is named in honour of Scarab worker Paul Skelley.
