= Ataenius forgiei =

Scientific classification
- Kingdom: Animalia
- Phylum: Arthropoda
- Clade: Pancrustacea
- Class: Insecta
- Order: Coleoptera
- Suborder: Polyphaga
- Infraorder: Scarabaeiformia
- Family: Scarabaeidae
- Genus: Ataenius
- Species: A. forgiei

Binomial name
- Ataenius forgiei Bordat & Théry, 2012

Species of beetle

Ataenius forgiei is a species of beetle of the family Scarabaeidae. It is found in New Caledonia.

== Description ==
Adults reach a length of about 3.3 mm (0.13 in). They have a convex, glossy reddish-brown body, with the disc of the pronotum darker. The head and pronotum are glabrous, while the apical area of the elytra is pubescent.

== Etymology ==
The species is named in honour of Scarabaeidae specialist Shaun Forgie.
