= Ataenius lenkoi =

Scientific classification
- Kingdom: Animalia
- Phylum: Arthropoda
- Clade: Pancrustacea
- Class: Insecta
- Order: Coleoptera
- Suborder: Polyphaga
- Infraorder: Scarabaeiformia
- Family: Scarabaeidae
- Genus: Ataenius
- Species: A. lenkoi

Binomial name
- Ataenius lenkoi Petrovitz, 1973

Species of beetle

Ataenius lenkoi is a species of beetle of the family Scarabaeidae. It is found in Brazil (Bahia, Distrito Federal, Goiás, Maranhão, Mato Grosso, Mato Grosso do Sul, Minas Gerais, Pará, Santa Catarina, São Paulo, Tocantins) and Paraguay.

== Description ==
Adults reach a length of about 4.2–5.1 mm (0.17–0.20 in). They have an oblong-oval, convex, moderately shiny, dark brown body, with the anterior of the head, sides of the pronotum, elytra and legs usually reddish-brown.
