= Ataenius opacipennis =

Scientific classification
- Kingdom: Animalia
- Phylum: Arthropoda
- Clade: Pancrustacea
- Class: Insecta
- Order: Coleoptera
- Suborder: Polyphaga
- Infraorder: Scarabaeiformia
- Family: Scarabaeidae
- Genus: Ataenius
- Species: A. opacipennis

Binomial name
- Ataenius opacipennis Schmidt, 1910

Synonyms
- Ataenius drifti Endrödi, 1962

Species of beetle

Ataenius opacipennis is a species of beetle of the family Scarabaeidae. It is found in Brazil (Goiás, Maranhão, Mato Grosso, Piauí), Guyana, Paraguay, Suriname and Venezuela.
