= Ataenius santarosae =

Scientific classification
- Kingdom: Animalia
- Phylum: Arthropoda
- Clade: Pancrustacea
- Class: Insecta
- Order: Coleoptera
- Suborder: Polyphaga
- Infraorder: Scarabaeiformia
- Family: Scarabaeidae
- Genus: Ataenius
- Species: A. santarosae

Binomial name
- Ataenius santarosae Stebnicka, 2007

Species of beetle

Ataenius santarosae is a species of beetle of the family Scarabaeidae. It is found in Bolivia and Peru.

== Description ==
Adults reach a length of about 1.8–2.1 mm (0.071–0.083 in). They have a parallel-sided, convex body. The head and pronotum are dark brown to black, while the elytra are brownish and lighter than the fore body. The legs are brown.
