= Ataenius versicolor =

Scientific classification
- Kingdom: Animalia
- Phylum: Arthropoda
- Clade: Pancrustacea
- Class: Insecta
- Order: Coleoptera
- Suborder: Polyphaga
- Infraorder: Scarabaeiformia
- Family: Scarabaeidae
- Genus: Ataenius
- Species: A. versicolor

Binomial name
- Ataenius versicolor Schmidt, 1917

Synonyms
- Ataenius haitianus Hinton, 1937

Species of beetle

Ataenius versicolor is a species of beetle of the family Scarabaeidae. It is found in the Dominican Republic and Hispaniola.

== Description ==
Adults reach a length of about 3.9–4.6 mm (0.15–0.18 in). They have an oblong-oval, shagreened, piceous black body, with the apical third of the elytra reddish to yellowish brown, and sometimes also with reddish lateral intervals.

== Life history ==
Specimens have been collected in arid thorn forests.
