= Ataenius abditus =

Scientific classification
- Kingdom: Animalia
- Phylum: Arthropoda
- Clade: Pancrustacea
- Class: Insecta
- Order: Coleoptera
- Suborder: Polyphaga
- Infraorder: Scarabaeiformia
- Family: Scarabaeidae
- Genus: Ataenius
- Species: A. abditus

Binomial name
- Ataenius abditus (Haldeman, 1848)

Synonyms
- Aphodius (Oxyomus) abditus Haldeman, 1848

Species of beetle

Ataenius abditus is a species of aphodiine dung beetle in the family Scarabaeidae. It is found in Canada (New Brunswick, Ontario, Quebec), the United States (Florida, Georgia, Illinois, Indiana, Iowa, Kentucky, Maryland, Massachusetts, Michigan, Mississippi, New Hampshire, New Jersey, New York, North Carolina, Ohio, Pennsylvania, South Carolina, South Dakota, Tennessee, Vermont, Virginia, West Virginia) and Mexico (Hidalgo, Sinaloa, Sonora, Tabasco, Tamaulipas).
