= Ataenius horticola =

Scientific classification
- Kingdom: Animalia
- Phylum: Arthropoda
- Clade: Pancrustacea
- Class: Insecta
- Order: Coleoptera
- Suborder: Polyphaga
- Infraorder: Scarabaeiformia
- Family: Scarabaeidae
- Genus: Ataenius
- Species: A. horticola

Binomial name
- Ataenius horticola Harold, 1869

Synonyms
- Psammodius multipunctatus Marseul, 1878; Psammodius alleoni Fairmaire, 1875; Euparia cypria Baudi, 1870

Species of beetle

Ataenius horticola is a species of beetle of the family Scarabaeidae. It is found in Afghanistan, Armenia, Azerbaijan, Bulgaria, Croatia, Cyprus, Germany, Greece (Crete), Iran, Iraq, Israel, Jordan, Lebanon, Macedonia, Syria, Tajikistan, Turkey and Ukraine.

== Description ==
Adults reach a length of about 4.2–5 mm (0.17–0.20 in). They have an elongate, fairly parallel-sided, not very shiny, black or brownish-black body, with the anterior margin of the head and the legs reddish-brown.
