= Ataenius dentatus =

Scientific classification
- Kingdom: Animalia
- Phylum: Arthropoda
- Clade: Pancrustacea
- Class: Insecta
- Order: Coleoptera
- Suborder: Polyphaga
- Infraorder: Scarabaeiformia
- Family: Scarabaeidae
- Genus: Ataenius
- Species: A. dentatus

Binomial name
- Ataenius dentatus Koshantschikov, 1916

Species of beetle

Ataenius dentatus is a species of beetle of the family Scarabaeidae. It is found in India (Andaman and Nicobar islands).

== Description ==
Adults reach a length of about 3.3 mm (0.13 in). They have an elongate-oval, only slightly convex, dark brown body, with the front edge of the head lighter.
