= Ataenius imparilis =

Scientific classification
- Kingdom: Animalia
- Phylum: Arthropoda
- Clade: Pancrustacea
- Class: Insecta
- Order: Coleoptera
- Suborder: Polyphaga
- Infraorder: Scarabaeiformia
- Family: Scarabaeidae
- Genus: Ataenius
- Species: A. imparilis

Binomial name
- Ataenius imparilis Blackburn, 1904

Species of beetle

Ataenius imparilis is a species of beetle of the family Scarabaeidae. It is found in Australia (New South Wales) and New Caledonia.

== Description ==
Adults reach a length of about 4.5–6 mm (0.18–0.24 in). They have a convex, slightly shiny, brownish-black body, with the anterior margin of the head and the anterior angles of the pronotum slightly paler. They have short hairs. The legs are reddish-brown.
