= Ataenius bicolor =

Scientific classification
- Kingdom: Animalia
- Phylum: Arthropoda
- Clade: Pancrustacea
- Class: Insecta
- Order: Coleoptera
- Suborder: Polyphaga
- Infraorder: Scarabaeiformia
- Family: Scarabaeidae
- Genus: Ataenius
- Species: A. bicolor

Binomial name
- Ataenius bicolor Petrovitz, 1963

Species of beetle

Ataenius bicolor is a species of beetle of the family Scarabaeidae. It is found in Cuba and Jamaica.

== Description ==
Adults reach a length of about 3–4.5 mm (0.12–0.18 in). They have a shining, yellowish-brown, dark brown or black body, with the lateral intervals and apex of the elytra reddish or yellowish brown.
