= Ataenius borjae =

Scientific classification
- Kingdom: Animalia
- Phylum: Arthropoda
- Clade: Pancrustacea
- Class: Insecta
- Order: Coleoptera
- Suborder: Polyphaga
- Infraorder: Scarabaeiformia
- Family: Scarabaeidae
- Genus: Ataenius
- Species: A. borjae

Binomial name
- Ataenius borjae Stebnicka, 2005

Species of beetle

Ataenius borjae is a species of beetle of the family Scarabaeidae. It is found in Bolivia.

== Description ==
Adults reach a length of about 3–3.2 mm (0.12–0.13 in). They have an oblong oval, moderately convex, glabrous and shiny body. They are dark castaneous, with the anterior of the clypeus, sides of the pronotum, ventral surface and legs reddish.
