= Ataenius wenzelii =

Scientific classification
- Kingdom: Animalia
- Phylum: Arthropoda
- Clade: Pancrustacea
- Class: Insecta
- Order: Coleoptera
- Suborder: Polyphaga
- Infraorder: Scarabaeiformia
- Family: Scarabaeidae
- Genus: Ataenius
- Species: A. wenzelii

Binomial name
- Ataenius wenzelii Horn, 1887

Synonyms
- Ataenius ludovicianus Fall, 1930; Ataenius rudellus Fall, 1930

Species of beetle

Ataenius wenzelii is a species of aphodiine dung beetle in the family Scarabaeidae. It is found in the United States (Florida, Iowa, Maryland, Mississippi, New Jersey, New York, Pennsylvania, South Carolina, Texas).

== Description ==
Adults reach a length of about 4.5–5.5 mm (0.18–0.22 in). They have an elongate-oblong, moderately shiny to opaque, black body, with the legs reddish.
