= Ataenius lamarensis =

Scientific classification
- Kingdom: Animalia
- Phylum: Arthropoda
- Clade: Pancrustacea
- Class: Insecta
- Order: Coleoptera
- Suborder: Polyphaga
- Infraorder: Scarabaeiformia
- Family: Scarabaeidae
- Genus: Ataenius
- Species: A. lamarensis

Binomial name
- Ataenius lamarensis Stebnicka, 2007

Species of beetle

Ataenius lamarensis is a species of beetle of the family Scarabaeidae. It is found in Argentina, Bolivia and Peru.

== Description ==
Adults reach a length of about 3.2–3.8 mm (0.13–0.15 in). They have an alutaceous, in part setaceous, piceous body, with reddish brown legs.
