= Ataenius strigatus =

Scientific classification
- Kingdom: Animalia
- Phylum: Arthropoda
- Clade: Pancrustacea
- Class: Insecta
- Order: Coleoptera
- Suborder: Polyphaga
- Infraorder: Scarabaeiformia
- Family: Scarabaeidae
- Genus: Ataenius
- Species: A. strigatus

Binomial name
- Ataenius strigatus (Say, 1823)

Synonyms
- Aphodius strigatus Say, 1823

Species of beetle

Ataenius strigatus is a species of aphodiine dung beetle in the family Scarabaeidae. It is found in Canada (New Brunswick, Ontario, Quebec), the United States (Florida, Indiana, Iowa, Kansas, Maryland, Michigan, Mississippi, Nebraska, New Jersey, Ohio, South Carolina, South Dakota, Tennessee, Texas, Virginia, Wisconsin) and Mexico (Distrito Federal, Durango, Guerrero, Nuevo León, Sinaloa, Tabasco, Veracruz).

== Description ==
Adults reach a length of about 3.8–5.5 mm (0.15–0.22 in). They have an elongate-oblong, shiny black body, with the legs usually reddish black.

== Life history ==
Specimens have been collected in cow dung.
