= Ataenius miamii =

Scientific classification
- Kingdom: Animalia
- Phylum: Arthropoda
- Clade: Pancrustacea
- Class: Insecta
- Order: Coleoptera
- Suborder: Polyphaga
- Infraorder: Scarabaeiformia
- Family: Scarabaeidae
- Genus: Ataenius
- Species: A. miamii

Binomial name
- Ataenius miamii Cartwright, 1934

Species of beetle

Ataenius miamii is a species of aphodiine dung beetle in the family Scarabaeidae. It is found in the United States (Alabama, Florida, Georgia, Illinois, Maryland, Mississippi, New Jersey, New York, North Carolina, South Carolina, Texas, Wisconsin) and on the Bahamas.

== Description ==
Adults reach a length of about 3.3–4.2 mm (0.13–0.17 in). They have an oval, convex, dull body, often with an oily coating.

== Life history ==
Specimens have been collected in coastal and other sandy areas near water.
