= Ataenius plaumanni =

Scientific classification
- Kingdom: Animalia
- Phylum: Arthropoda
- Clade: Pancrustacea
- Class: Insecta
- Order: Coleoptera
- Suborder: Polyphaga
- Infraorder: Scarabaeiformia
- Family: Scarabaeidae
- Genus: Ataenius
- Species: A. plaumanni

Binomial name
- Ataenius plaumanni Petrovitz, 1973

Species of beetle

Ataenius plaumanni is a species of beetle of the family Scarabaeidae. It is found in Argentina, Bolivia and Brazil (Mato Grosso, Minas Gerais, Pará, Rondônia).

== Description ==
Adults reach a length of about 4–4.5 mm (0.16–0.18 in). They have an oblong-oval, moderately shiny, black body, with the clypeal and lateral pronotal edge and legs reddish.
