= Ataenius pseudimparilis =

Scientific classification
- Kingdom: Animalia
- Phylum: Arthropoda
- Clade: Pancrustacea
- Class: Insecta
- Order: Coleoptera
- Suborder: Polyphaga
- Infraorder: Scarabaeiformia
- Family: Scarabaeidae
- Genus: Ataenius
- Species: A. pseudimparilis

Binomial name
- Ataenius pseudimparilis Stebnicka & Howden, 1997

Species of beetle

Ataenius pseudimparilis is a species of beetle of the family Scarabaeidae. It is found in Australia (Queensland).

== Description ==
Adults reach a length of about 4.5–5.8 mm (0.18–0.23 in). They have an oblong-oval, alutaceous, brownish-black or greyish-black to black body, covered with short, yellow setae. The margin of the clypeus and legs are reddish-brown.
