= Ataenius insulae =

Scientific classification
- Kingdom: Animalia
- Phylum: Arthropoda
- Clade: Pancrustacea
- Class: Insecta
- Order: Coleoptera
- Suborder: Polyphaga
- Infraorder: Scarabaeiformia
- Family: Scarabaeidae
- Genus: Ataenius
- Species: A. insulae

Binomial name
- Ataenius insulae Chalumeau & Gruner, 1974

Species of beetle

Ataenius insulae is a species of beetle of the family Scarabaeidae. It is found on Guadeloupe.

== Description ==
Adults reach a length of about 3.7–4 mm (0.15–0.16 in). They have an oblong-oval body, with the head and pronotum piceous and the elytra dark brown.
