= Ataenius opatrinus =

Scientific classification
- Kingdom: Animalia
- Phylum: Arthropoda
- Clade: Pancrustacea
- Class: Insecta
- Order: Coleoptera
- Suborder: Polyphaga
- Infraorder: Scarabaeiformia
- Family: Scarabaeidae
- Genus: Ataenius
- Species: A. opatrinus

Binomial name
- Ataenius opatrinus Harold, 1867

Synonyms
- Ataenius paraperforatus Deloya & Ibanez-bernal, 2000; Ataenius woodruffi Cartwright, 1974; Ataenius narialis Petrovitz, 1973

Species of beetle

Ataenius opatrinus is a species of beetle of the family Scarabaeidae. It is found in Argentina, Brazil (Bahia, Espírito Santo, Minas Gerais, Rio de Janeiro, Rio Grande do Sul, Santa Catarina, São Paulo), Colombia, Costa Rica, Mexico (Chiapas, Veracruz), Uruguay and Venezuela, as well as in Florida.
