= Ataenius koghianus =

Scientific classification
- Kingdom: Animalia
- Phylum: Arthropoda
- Clade: Pancrustacea
- Class: Insecta
- Order: Coleoptera
- Suborder: Polyphaga
- Infraorder: Scarabaeiformia
- Family: Scarabaeidae
- Genus: Ataenius
- Species: A. koghianus

Binomial name
- Ataenius koghianus Paulian, 1991

Species of beetle

Ataenius koghianus is a species of beetle of the family Scarabaeidae. It is found in New Caledonia.

== Description ==
Adults reach a length of about 3.4–3.7 mm (0.13–0.15 in). The elytra are brownish-yellow, with a few small dark spots.
