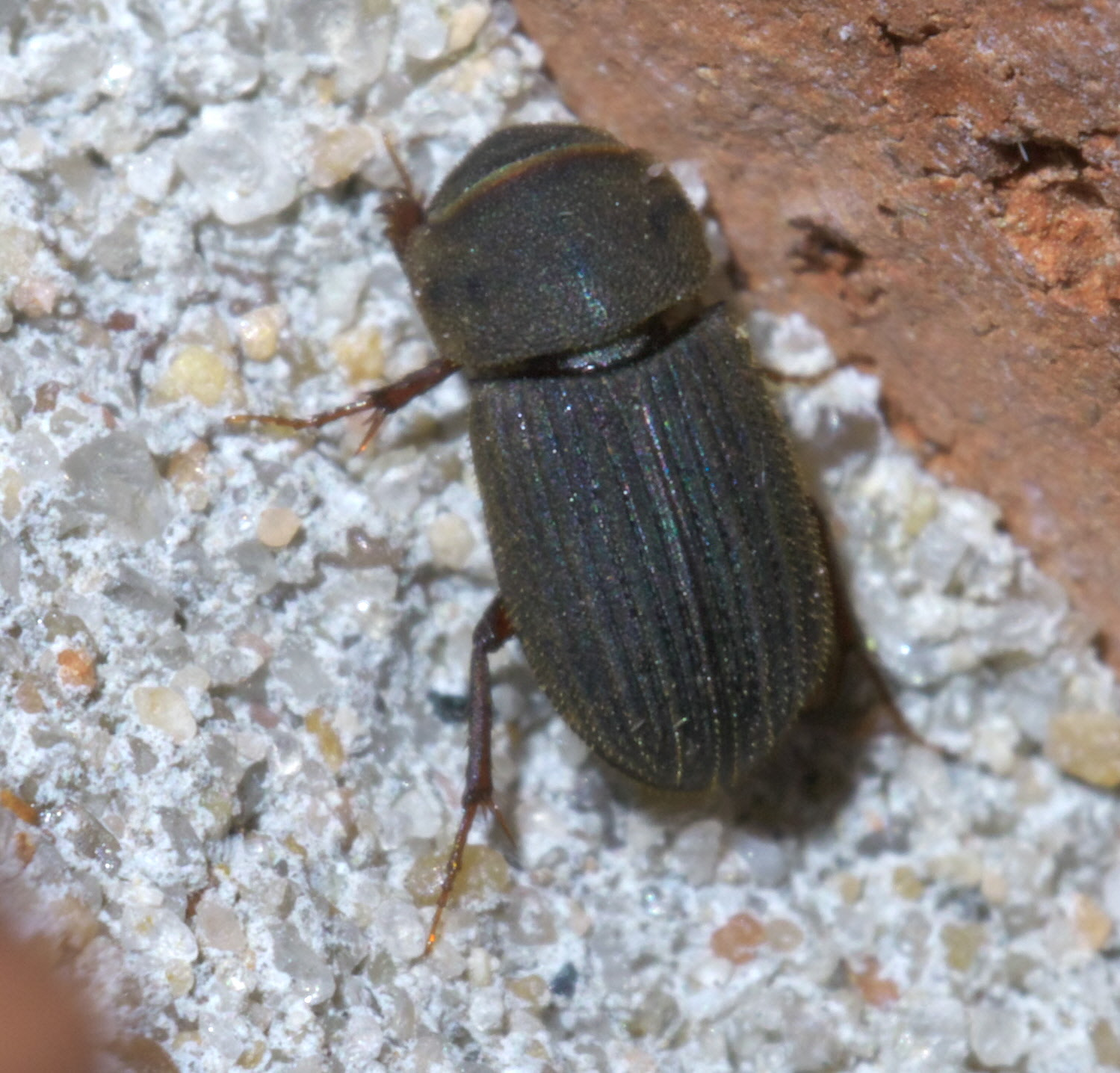
- Ataenius imbricatus

Scientific classification
- Kingdom: Animalia
- Phylum: Arthropoda
- Clade: Pancrustacea
- Class: Insecta
- Order: Coleoptera
- Suborder: Polyphaga
- Infraorder: Scarabaeiformia
- Family: Scarabaeidae
- Tribe: Eupariini
- Genus: Ataenius; Harold, 1867

Synonyms
- Ataenius (Stenataenius) Chalumeau, 1982 [2][4]; Aphodius (Pseudammoecius) Schmidt, 1914 [3][8]; Hexalus Mulsant & Rey, 1870 [6][7]; Aphodinus Motschulsky, 1862

= Ataenius =

Genus of beetles

Ataenius is a genus of aphodiine dung beetles in the family Scarabaeidae. There are at least 290 described species in Ataenius.

== Species ==
- Ataenius abancay Stebnicka, 2005^{c g}
- Ataenius abditus (Haldeman, 1848)^{i c g b}
- Ataenius aciculus Hinton, 1936^{c g}
- Ataenius acutulus (Schmidt, 1913)^{c g}
- Ataenius aequalis Harold, 1880^{i c g}
- Ataenius aequatorialis Petrovitz, 1961^{c g}
- Ataenius africanus Endrödi, 1967^{c g}
- Ataenius alternatus (Melsheimer, 1845)^{i c g b}
- Ataenius ambaritae Stebnicka, 1988^{c g}
- Ataenius angulatus Petrovitz, 1964^{c g}
- Ataenius annanus Stebnicka & Howden, 1997^{c g}
- Ataenius aphodiiformis Bordat & Théry, 2012^{c g}
- Ataenius apicalis Hinton, 1937^{i c g}
- Ataenius arenosus Harold, 1868^{c g}
- Ataenius arrowi Hinton, 1936^{c g}
- Ataenius asper Petrovitz, 1975^{c g}
- Ataenius atramentarius (Erichson, 1847)^{c}
- Ataenius attenuator Harold, 1874^{c g}
- Ataenius australasiae (Boheman, 1858)^{c g}
- Ataenius australis Harold, 1875^{c g}
- Ataenius balthasari Petrovitz, 1973^{c g}
- Ataenius barberi Cartwright, 1974^{i c g}
- Ataenius basiceps Lea, 1923^{c g}
- Ataenius beattyi Chapin, 1940^{c g}
- Ataenius benarabyensis Stebnicka & Howden, 1997^{c g}
- Ataenius bicolor Petrovitz, 1963^{c g}
- Ataenius biroi (Endrödi, 1951)^{c g}
- Ataenius bispinulosus Schmidt, 1911^{c g}
- Ataenius blapoides Balthasar, 1947^{c g}
- Ataenius bolivarensis Stebnicka, 2007^{c g}
- Ataenius bolivari Stebnicka, 2001^{c g}
- Ataenius borgmeieri Hinton, 1936^{c g}
- Ataenius borjae Stebnicka, 2005^{c g}
- Ataenius borneensis Minkina & Bellmann, 2023
- Ataenius brevicollis (Wollaston, 1854)^{i c g}
- Ataenius brevis Fall, 1930^{i c g}
- Ataenius brevitarsis Petrovitz, 1964^{c g}
- Ataenius brouni (Sharp, 1876)^{c g}
- Ataenius buenavistae Stebnicka, 2001^{c g}
- Ataenius caesoides (Fairmaire, 1899)^{c g}
- Ataenius caicarae Stebnicka, 2005^{c g}
- Ataenius californicus Horn, 1887^{i c g}
- Ataenius canoasus Stebnicka, 2007^{c g}
- Ataenius carinatipennis Petrovitz, 1973^{c g}
- Ataenius carinator HAROLD, 1874^{i c g b}
- Ataenius cartago Stebnicka, 2007^{c g}
- Ataenius cartwrighti Chalumeau & Gruner, 1974^{c g}
- Ataenius castaniellus Bates, 1887^{i c g}
- Ataenius catarinaensis Stebnicka, 2007^{c g}
- Ataenius catenulatus (Erichson, 1847)^{c g}
- Ataenius cavagnaroi Cartwright, 1970^{c g}
- Ataenius ceylonensis Schmidt, 1912^{c g}
- Ataenius chapini Hinton, 1937^{c g}
- Ataenius chilensis (Solier, 1851)^{c g}
- Ataenius chinacotae Stebnicka, 2007^{c g}
- Ataenius circulusbrumalis Petrovitz, 1964^{c g}
- Ataenius clavatus Schmidt, 1916^{c g}
- Ataenius clitellarius Petrovitz, 1973^{c g}
- Ataenius cochabambae Stebnicka, 2005^{c g}
- Ataenius cognatus (LeConte, 1858)^{i c g b} (slender dung beetle)
- Ataenius columbicus Harold, 1880^{c g}
- Ataenius communis Hinton, 1936^{c g}
- Ataenius complicatus Harold, 1869^{c g}
- Ataenius confertus Fall, 1909^{i c g b}
- Ataenius coriarius Schmidt, 1912^{c g}
- Ataenius corporaali Boucomont, 1924^{c g}
- Ataenius corrosus Chapin, 1940^{c g}
- Ataenius costulifer Balthasar, 1941^{c g}
- Ataenius crenaticollis Petrovitz, 1973^{c g}
- Ataenius crenatipennis (MacLeay, 1871)^{c g}
- Ataenius crenator Harold, 1876^{c g}
- Ataenius crenatostriatus (Blanchard, 1843)^{c g}
- Ataenius crenulatus Schmidt, 1910^{i c g}
- Ataenius cribrithorax Bates, 1887^{i c g}
- Ataenius cristobalensis Cook & Peck, 2000^{c g}
- Ataenius cucutae Stebnicka, 2007^{c g}
- Ataenius cylindrus Horn, 1871^{i c g}
- Ataenius dentatus Koshantschikov, 1916^{c g}
- Ataenius depilis Petrovitz, 1976^{c g}
- Ataenius deserti Blackburn, 1894^{c g}
- Ataenius desertus Horn, 1871^{i c g b}
- Ataenius ecruensis Stebnicka and Lago, 2005^{i c g}
- Ataenius edungalbae Stebnicka & Howden, 1997^{c g}
- Ataenius elegans Harold, 1868^{c g}
- Ataenius elisaensis Stebnicka, 2002^{c g}
- Ataenius elongatulus (Macleay, 1888)^{c g}
- Ataenius elongatus (Palisot de Beauvois, 1811)^{c g}
- Ataenius endroedyyoungai Endrödi, 1973^{c g}
- Ataenius erinaceus Petrovitz, 1961^{c g}
- Ataenius eringundae Stebnicka & Howden, 1997^{c g}
- Ataenius erratus Fall, 1930^{i c g}
- †Ataenius europaeus Quiel, 1910^{c g}
- Ataenius eurynotus Lea, 1923^{c g}
- Ataenius excisicollis Petrovitz, 1961^{c g}
- Ataenius exiguus Brown, 1932^{i c g b}
- Ataenius fattigi Cartwright, 1948^{i c g b}
- Ataenius floreanae Cook & Peck, 2000^{c g}
- Ataenius forgiei Bordat & Théry, 2012^{c g}
- Ataenius forsteri Balthasar, 1960^{c g}
- Ataenius freyi Petrovitz, 1961^{c g}
- Ataenius gammonensis Stebnicka & Howden, 1997^{c g}
- Ataenius garamas Peyerimhoff, 1929^{c g}
- Ataenius gascoyneensis Stebnicka & Howden, 1997^{c g}
- Ataenius gibbus Blackburn, 1904^{c g}
- Ataenius gilesi Stebnicka & Howden, 1997^{c g}
- Ataenius glabriventris Schmidt, 1911^{c g}
- Ataenius glaseri Cartwright, 1974^{i c g}
- Ataenius gracilis (Melsheimer, 1845)^{i c g b}
- Ataenius granocostatus Schmidt, 1912^{c g}
- Ataenius gruneri Chalumeau, 1979^{c g}
- Ataenius guanacastae Stebnicka, 2005^{c g}
- Ataenius guayasi Stebnicka, 2001^{c g}
- Ataenius gungareei Stebnicka & Howden, 1997^{c g}
- Ataenius guriensis Stebnicka, 2005^{c g}
- Ataenius heinekeni (Wollaston, 1854)^{i c g}
- Ataenius hesperius Cartwright, 1974^{i c g b}
- Ataenius hirsutus Horn, 1871^{i c g b}
- Ataenius hispaniolae Chalumeau, 1982^{c g}
- Ataenius hispidus Harold, 1867^{c g}
- Ataenius holopubescens Hinton, 1938^{c g}
- Ataenius horticola Harold, 1869^{c g}
- Ataenius howdeni Chalumeau, 1978^{c g}
- Ataenius hrubanti Balthasar, 1967^{c g}
- Ataenius huanus Stebnicka, 2007^{c g}
- Ataenius humptydooensis Stebnicka & Howden, 1997^{c g}
- Ataenius hygrophilus Paulian, 1947^{c g}
- Ataenius icanus Balthasar, 1941^{c g}
- Ataenius illaetabilis Lea, 1923^{c g}
- Ataenius imbricatoides Schmidt, 1909^{c g}
- Ataenius imbricatus (Melsheimer, 1845)^{i c g b}
- Ataenius imparilis Blackburn, 1904^{c g}
- Ataenius impiger Schmidt, 1916^{c g}
- Ataenius impressus (Petrovitz, 1963)^{c g}
- Ataenius indutus Petrovitz, 1961^{c g}
- Ataenius inquisitus Horn, 1887^{i c g b}
- Ataenius insculptus Horn, 1887^{i c g b}
- Ataenius insolitus Schmidt, 1909^{c g}
- Ataenius insulae Chalumeau & Gruner, 1974^{c g}
- Ataenius insularis Lea, 1923^{c g}
- Ataenius integricollis Lea, 1923^{c g}
- Ataenius intermedius Bates, 1887^{c g}
- Ataenius iquitosae Stebnicka, 2007^{c g}
- Ataenius isabelae Franz, 1985^{c g}
- Ataenius jamaicensis Chapin, 1940^{c g}
- Ataenius jardinensis Stebnicka, 2002^{c g}
- Ataenius jelineki Chalumeau, 1982^{c g}
- Ataenius kapalgaensis Stebnicka & Howden, 1997^{c g}
- Ataenius klapperichi Howden, 1978^{c g}
- Ataenius kochi Balthasar, 1941^{c g}
- Ataenius koebelei Blackburn, 1904^{c g}
- Ataenius koelleri Balthasar, 1963^{c g}
- Ataenius koghianus Paulian, 1991^{c g}
- Ataenius lamarensis Stebnicka, 2007^{c g}
- Ataenius lamotteiroyi Bordat, 1992^{c g}
- Ataenius lanei Petrovitz, 1973^{c g}
- Ataenius languidus Schmidt, 1911^{i c g}
- Ataenius latus Petrovitz, 1963^{c g}
- Ataenius lenkoi Petrovitz, 1973^{c g}
- Ataenius liogaster Bates, 1887^{i c g}
- Ataenius lobatus Horn, 1871^{i c g}
- Ataenius londrinae Stebnicka, 2007^{c g}
- Ataenius longiclavus Petrovitz, 1970^{c g}
- Ataenius luctuosus (Burmeister, 1877)^{c g}
- Ataenius luteomargo Chapin, 1940^{c g}
- Ataenius madagassicus Bordat, 1990^{c g}
- Ataenius maghribinicus Baraud, 1985^{c g}
- Ataenius martinezi Petrovitz, 1973^{c g}
- Ataenius miamii Cartwright, 1934^{i c g b}
- Ataenius michelii Chalumeau, 1978^{c g}
- Ataenius microtrichopterus Lea, 1923^{c g}
- Ataenius millstreamae Stebnicka & Howden, 1997^{c g}
- Ataenius montanus Schmidt, 1911^{c g}
- Ataenius monteithi Paulian, 1991^{c g}
- Ataenius monticola Paulian, 1940^{c g}
- Ataenius montreuili Bordat & Théry, 2012^{c g}
- Ataenius morator Harold, 1869^{c g}
- Ataenius murchisoni Stebnicka & Howden, 1997^{c g}
- Ataenius nakpandurii Endrödi, 1973^{c g}
- Ataenius nanus (Degeer, 1774)^{c g}
- Ataenius napoensis Stebnicka, 2007^{c g}
- Ataenius nigricans Paulian, 1933^{c g}
- Ataenius noques Stebnicka, 2007^{c g}
- Ataenius noronhai Stebnicka, 2007^{c g}
- Ataenius nudus Blackburn, 1904^{c g}
- Ataenius nugator Harold, 1880^{c g}
- Ataenius oaxacaensis Stebnicka & Lago, 2005^{c g}
- Ataenius ocumarensis Stebnicka, 2001^{c g}
- Ataenius oklahomensis Brown, 1930^{i c g}
- Ataenius onkonensis Stebnicka, 2005^{c g}
- Ataenius opacipennis Schmidt, 1910^{c g}
- Ataenius opatrinus Harold, 1867^{i c g}
- Ataenius opatroides (Blanchard, 1846)^{c g}
- Ataenius ovatulus Horn, 1871^{i c g b}
- Ataenius pacificus (Sharp, 1879)^{i c g}
- Ataenius palmaritoensis Stebnicka, 2007^{c g}
- Ataenius palmerstoni Blackburn, 1891^{c g}
- Ataenius palustris (Montrouzier, 1860)^{c g}
- Ataenius panamensis Hinton, 1936^{c g}
- Ataenius parallelipennis Petrovitz, 1973^{c g}
- Ataenius parvus Lea, 1923^{c g}
- Ataenius patescens Scudder, 1893^{c g}
- Ataenius pearlensis Stebnicka, 2006^{c g}
- Ataenius peregianensis Stebnicka & Howden, 1997^{c g}
- Ataenius peregrinator Harold, 1877^{i c g}
- Ataenius pereirai Petrovitz, 1970^{c g}
- Ataenius perforatus Harold, 1867^{c g}
- Ataenius pertuga Balthasar, 1961^{c g}
- Ataenius petrovitzi Balthasar, 1960^{c g}
- Ataenius picinus Harold, 1867^{i c g b} (pitchy scarab)
- Ataenius platensis (Blanchard, 1847)^{i c g b}
- Ataenius plaumanni Petrovitz, 1973^{c g}
- Ataenius polyglyptus Bates, 1887^{c g}
- Ataenius pseudimparilis Stebnicka & Howden, 1997^{c g}
- Ataenius pseudocarinator Balthasar, 1947^{c g}
- Ataenius pseudoclavatus Stebnicka, 2005^{c g}
- Ataenius pseudocommunis Stebnicka, 2001^{c g}
- Ataenius pseudostercorator Stebnicka, 2003^{c g}
- Ataenius pseudousingeri Galante, Stebnicka & Verdu, 2003^{c g}
- Ataenius punctatohirsutus Schmidt, 1909^{c g}
- Ataenius puncticollis LeConte, 1868^{i g}
- Ataenius punctipennis Harold, 1868^{c g}
- Ataenius purator Harold, 1868^{c g}
- Ataenius quintanaroo Stebnicka, 2006^{c g}
- Ataenius raccurti Chalumeau, 1978^{c g}
- Ataenius rakovici Bordat & Théry, 2012^{c g}
- Ataenius raslani Bordat & Théry, 2012^{c g}
- Ataenius raucus (Schmidt, 1908)^{c g}
- Ataenius restructus (Wickham, 1912)^{c g}
- Ataenius robustus Horn, 1871^{i c g b} (saline prairie scarab beetle)
- Ataenius rosinae Balthasar, 1967^{c g}
- Ataenius rubrotessellatus (Blanchard, 1846)^{c g}
- Ataenius saltae Stebnicka, 2007^{c g}
- Ataenius santarosae Stebnicka, 2007^{c g}
- Ataenius saulensis Stebnicka, 2006^{c g}
- Ataenius scabrelloides Petrovitz, 1962^{i c g}
- Ataenius scabrellus Schmidt, 1909^{i c g}
- Ataenius scalptifrons Bates, 1887^{c g}
- Ataenius schmidti Stebnicka, 2003^{c g}
- Ataenius sculptilis Harold, 1868^{c g}
- Ataenius sculptor Harold, 1868^{i c g}
- Ataenius scutellaris Harold, 1867^{c g}
- Ataenius seaforthensis Stebnicka & Howden, 1997^{c g}
- Ataenius semicoecus (Macleay, 1888)^{c g}
- Ataenius semicornutus (MacLeay, 1871)^{c g}
- Ataenius setiger Bates, 1887^{i c g b}
- Ataenius setosus Schmidt, 1909^{c g}
- Ataenius seydeli Endrödi, 1964^{c g}
- Ataenius siminasus Petrovitz, 1973^{c g}
- Ataenius simplicipes (Mulsant & Rey, 1870)^{c g}
- Ataenius skelleyi Stebnicka, 2007^{c g}
- Ataenius sparsicollis Blackburn, 1904^{c g}
- Ataenius speculator Blackburn, 1891^{c g}
- Ataenius spinipennis Lea, 1923^{c g}
- Ataenius spretulus (Haldeman, 1848)^{i c g b} (black turfgrass ataenius)
- Ataenius stebnickae Bordat & Théry, 2012^{c g}
- Ataenius steinheili Harold, 1874^{c g}
- Ataenius stephani Cartwright, 1974^{i c g b}
- Ataenius stercorator (Fabricius, 1775)^{i c g}
- Ataenius striatocrenatus (Fairmaire, 1889)^{c g}
- Ataenius strigatus (Say, 1823)^{i c g b}
- Ataenius strigicaudus Bates, 1887^{c g}
- Ataenius strigifrons Schmidt, 1920^{c g}
- Ataenius suineata Deloya, 2012^{c g}
- Ataenius synnotensis Stebnicka & Howden, 1997^{c g}
- Ataenius talpoides Stebnicka, 2001^{c g}
- Ataenius tambopatae Stebnicka, 2001^{c g}
- Ataenius tarumensis Stebnicka, 2007^{c g}
- Ataenius temperei Chalumeau & Gruner, 1974^{c g}
- Ataenius terminalis (Chevrolat, 1864)^{c g}
- Ataenius texanus Harold, 1874^{i c g b}
- Ataenius tindalensis Stebnicka & Howden, 1997^{c g}
- Ataenius tomentosus Petrovitz, 1969^{c g}
- Ataenius torridus Blackburn, 1892^{c g}
- Ataenius tovarensis Stebnicka, 2001^{c g}
- Ataenius tuberculatus Schmidt, 1911^{c g}
- Ataenius uriarrae Stebnicka & Howden, 1997^{c g}
- Ataenius usingeri Hinton, 1936^{c g}
- Ataenius utahensis Cartwright, 1974^{i c g}
- Ataenius vandykei Cartwright, 1974^{i}
- Ataenius variopunctatus Schmidt, 1922^{c g}
- Ataenius versicolor Schmidt, 1916^{c g}
- Ataenius vethianus Schmidt, 1909^{c g}
- Ataenius vinacoensis Stebnicka, 2006^{c g}
- Ataenius walkeri Blackburn, 1904^{c g}
- Ataenius walterhorni Balthasar, 1938^{c g}
- Ataenius warisensis Stebnicka, 1998^{c g}
- Ataenius wenzelii Horn, 1887^{i b}
- Ataenius windjanae Stebnicka & Howden, 1997^{c g}
- Ataenius yungasus Stebnicka, 2001^{c g}

Data sources: i = ITIS, c = Catalogue of Life, g = GBIF, b = Bugguide.net
