= Ataenius liogaster =

Scientific classification
- Kingdom: Animalia
- Phylum: Arthropoda
- Clade: Pancrustacea
- Class: Insecta
- Order: Coleoptera
- Suborder: Polyphaga
- Infraorder: Scarabaeiformia
- Family: Scarabaeidae
- Genus: Ataenius
- Species: A. liogaster

Binomial name
- Ataenius liogaster Bates, 1887

Synonyms
- Ataenius hoguei Cartwright & Spangler, 1981; Ataenius kelatianus Balthasar, 1965; Ataenius nitidulus Nomura, 1943; Ataenius edwardsi Chapin, 1940; Ataenius orbicularis Schmidt, 1914

Species of beetle

Ataenius liogaster is a species of beetle of the family Scarabaeidae. It is found on Christmas Island, as well as in Indonesia, Malaysia (Sarawak), the Philippines, Thailand, Vietnam, Antigua, Barbados, Carriacou, the Dominican Republic, the Galapagos islands, El Salvador, Grenada, Guadeloupe, Hispaniola, Jamaica, Puerto Rico, Saint Croix, Saint Lucia, Saint Vincent, Mexico (Chiapas, Colima, Guerrero, Nayarit, Nuevo León, Puebla, Quintana Roo, Sinaloa, Veracruz) and Suriname.

== Description ==
Adults reach a length of about 3.5–5 mm (0.14–0.20 in). They have a shiny, black body, eith the legs reddish brown.

== Life history ==
Specimens have been collected in various biotopes and have in soil and leaf litter.
