= Ataenius circulusbrumalis =

Scientific classification
- Kingdom: Animalia
- Phylum: Arthropoda
- Clade: Pancrustacea
- Class: Insecta
- Order: Coleoptera
- Suborder: Polyphaga
- Infraorder: Scarabaeiformia
- Family: Scarabaeidae
- Genus: Ataenius
- Species: A. circulusbrumalis

Binomial name
- Ataenius circulusbrumalis Petrovitz, 1964

Species of beetle

Ataenius circulusbrumalis is a species of beetle of the family Scarabaeidae. It is found in Australia (Northern Territory, Queensland).

== Description ==
Adults reach a length of about 3–4 mm (0.12–0.16 in). They have an elongate-oval, convex, moderately to strongly alutaceous, partly setaceous, black or reddish-black body, with the anterior of the clypeus and legs reddish, and sometimes with the ventral surface also reddish.
