= Ataenius kapalgaensis =

Scientific classification
- Kingdom: Animalia
- Phylum: Arthropoda
- Clade: Pancrustacea
- Class: Insecta
- Order: Coleoptera
- Suborder: Polyphaga
- Infraorder: Scarabaeiformia
- Family: Scarabaeidae
- Genus: Ataenius
- Species: A. kapalgaensis

Binomial name
- Ataenius kapalgaensis Stebnicka & Howden, 1997

Species of beetle

Ataenius kapalgaensis is a species of beetle of the family Scarabaeidae. It is found in Australia (Northern Territory, Queensland, Western Australia).

== Description ==
Adults reach a length of about 3.8–4.2 mm (0.15–0.17 in). They have an elongate, almost parallel, opaque, minutely setaceous, greyish-brown to black body. In rare cases, they are covered by a coating. The legs are reddish-brown.
