= Ataenius hygrophilus =

Scientific classification
- Kingdom: Animalia
- Phylum: Arthropoda
- Clade: Pancrustacea
- Class: Insecta
- Order: Coleoptera
- Suborder: Polyphaga
- Infraorder: Scarabaeiformia
- Family: Scarabaeidae
- Genus: Ataenius
- Species: A. hygrophilus

Binomial name
- Ataenius hygrophilus Paulian, 1947

Species of beetle

Ataenius hygrophilus is a species of beetle of the family Scarabaeidae. It is found in Guadeloupe.

== Description ==
Adults reach a length of about 4–4.5 mm (0.16–0.18 in). They have an oblong oval, glabrous, moderately shining, piceous body.
