= Ataenius eringundae =

Scientific classification
- Kingdom: Animalia
- Phylum: Arthropoda
- Clade: Pancrustacea
- Class: Insecta
- Order: Coleoptera
- Suborder: Polyphaga
- Infraorder: Scarabaeiformia
- Family: Scarabaeidae
- Genus: Ataenius
- Species: A. eringundae

Binomial name
- Ataenius eringundae Stebnicka & Howden, 1997

Species of beetle

Ataenius eringundae is a species of beetle of the family Scarabaeidae. It is found in Australia (South Australia).

== Description ==
Adults reach a length of about 4–5.1 mm (0.16–0.20 in). They have an elongate-oval, convex, weakly shining, black body, which is usually covered with an argillaceous coating. The edge of the clypeus is reddish and the setae are yellow.
