= Ataenius elisaensis =

Scientific classification
- Kingdom: Animalia
- Phylum: Arthropoda
- Clade: Pancrustacea
- Class: Insecta
- Order: Coleoptera
- Suborder: Polyphaga
- Infraorder: Scarabaeiformia
- Family: Scarabaeidae
- Genus: Ataenius
- Species: A. elisaensis

Binomial name
- Ataenius elisaensis Stebnicka, 2002

Species of beetle

Ataenius elisaensis is a species of beetle of the family Scarabaeidae. It is found in the Dominican Republic.

== Description ==
Adults reach a length of about 4 mm (0.16 in). They have an elongate, parallel-sided, shining body, with the fore body piceous and the elytra dark brown with the lateral and apical areas reddish yellow.
