= Ataenius aciculus =

Scientific classification
- Kingdom: Animalia
- Phylum: Arthropoda
- Clade: Pancrustacea
- Class: Insecta
- Order: Coleoptera
- Suborder: Polyphaga
- Infraorder: Scarabaeiformia
- Family: Scarabaeidae
- Genus: Ataenius
- Species: A. aciculus

Binomial name
- Ataenius aciculus Hinton, 1936

Synonyms
- Ataenius apicecoloratus Balthasar, 1941

Species of beetle

Ataenius aciculus is a species of beetle of the family Scarabaeidae. It is found in the Dominican Republic, Haiti, Hispaniola.

== Description ==
Adults reach a length of about 3.7–4 mm (0.15–0.16 in). They have an oblong-oval, light piceous body, with the apical third of the elytra reddish to orange yellow.
