= Ataenius depilis =

Scientific classification
- Kingdom: Animalia
- Phylum: Arthropoda
- Clade: Pancrustacea
- Class: Insecta
- Order: Coleoptera
- Suborder: Polyphaga
- Infraorder: Scarabaeiformia
- Family: Scarabaeidae
- Genus: Ataenius
- Species: A. depilis

Binomial name
- Ataenius depilis Petrovitz, 1976

Species of beetle

Ataenius depilis is a species of beetle of the family Scarabaeidae. It is found in Ecuador, Venezuela and Trinidad & Tobago.

== Description ==
Adults reach a length of about 3–4.3 mm (0.12–0.17 in). They have an oblong-oval, moderately shiny, black body, with the clypeal and lateral pronotal edge and legs reddish.

== Life history ==
Specimens have been collected in gallery forests and taken from soil and log and leaf litter.
