= Ataenius imbricatoides =

Scientific classification
- Kingdom: Animalia
- Phylum: Arthropoda
- Clade: Pancrustacea
- Class: Insecta
- Order: Coleoptera
- Suborder: Polyphaga
- Infraorder: Scarabaeiformia
- Family: Scarabaeidae
- Genus: Ataenius
- Species: A. imbricatoides

Binomial name
- Ataenius imbricatoides Schmidt, 1909

Species of beetle

Ataenius imbricatoides is a species of beetle of the family Scarabaeidae. It is found in Argentina and Brazil (São Paulo).

== Description ==
Adults reach a length of about 3–3.8 mm (0.12–0.15 in). They have an almost parallel-sided, black body, which is strongly encrusted by an argillaceous coating.
