= Ataenius terminalis =

Scientific classification
- Kingdom: Animalia
- Phylum: Arthropoda
- Clade: Pancrustacea
- Class: Insecta
- Order: Coleoptera
- Suborder: Polyphaga
- Infraorder: Scarabaeiformia
- Family: Scarabaeidae
- Genus: Ataenius
- Species: A. terminalis

Binomial name
- Ataenius terminalis (Chevrolat, 1865)

Synonyms
- Auperia terminalis Chevrolat, 1865; Ataenius cilicollis Chevrolat; Ataenius laevicollis Chevrolat; Auperia terminalis ciliata Chevrolat, 1865

Species of beetle

Ataenius terminalis is a species of beetle of the family Scarabaeidae. It is found in Cuba and Jamaica.

== Description ==
Adults reach a length of about 3.8–4.8 mm (0.15–0.19 in). They have a moderately shining, dark brown to black body, often with the lateral intervals and apex of the elytra yellowish-brown.
