= Ataenius canoasus =

Scientific classification
- Kingdom: Animalia
- Phylum: Arthropoda
- Clade: Pancrustacea
- Class: Insecta
- Order: Coleoptera
- Suborder: Polyphaga
- Infraorder: Scarabaeiformia
- Family: Scarabaeidae
- Genus: Ataenius
- Species: A. canoasus

Binomial name
- Ataenius canoasus Stebnicka, 2007

Species of beetle

Ataenius canoasus is a species of beetle of the family Scarabaeidae. It is found in Argentina and Brazil (Mato Grosso do Sul, Rio Grande do Sul).

== Description ==
Adults reach a length of about 3.2–3.8 mm (0.13–0.15 in). They have an elongate, weakly convex, moderately shining, reddish brown to black body, with the elytra usually lighter than the head and pronotum and with brown legs.
