= Ataenius cartago =

Scientific classification
- Kingdom: Animalia
- Phylum: Arthropoda
- Clade: Pancrustacea
- Class: Insecta
- Order: Coleoptera
- Suborder: Polyphaga
- Infraorder: Scarabaeiformia
- Family: Scarabaeidae
- Genus: Ataenius
- Species: A. cartago

Binomial name
- Ataenius cartago Stebnicka, 2007

Species of beetle

Ataenius cartago is a species of beetle of the family Scarabaeidae. It is found in Costa Rica, Guatemala and Mexico (Veracruz).

== Description ==
Adults reach a length of about 3.8–4 mm (0.15–0.16 in). They have an elongate, parallel-sided, glabrous, shining, piceous to black body, with dark reddish brown legs.
