= Ataenius guanacastae =

Scientific classification
- Kingdom: Animalia
- Phylum: Arthropoda
- Clade: Pancrustacea
- Class: Insecta
- Order: Coleoptera
- Suborder: Polyphaga
- Infraorder: Scarabaeiformia
- Family: Scarabaeidae
- Genus: Ataenius
- Species: A. guanacastae

Binomial name
- Ataenius guanacastae Stebnicka, 2005

Species of beetle

Ataenius guanacastae is a species of beetle of the family Scarabaeidae. It is found in Costa Rica and Panama.

== Description ==
Adults reach a length of about 4–4.5 mm (0.16–0.18 in). They have an oblong-oval, moderately convex, shining black body, with the anterior edge of the clypeus and lateral margin of the pronotum reddish.
