= Ataenius confertus =

Scientific classification
- Kingdom: Animalia
- Phylum: Arthropoda
- Clade: Pancrustacea
- Class: Insecta
- Order: Coleoptera
- Suborder: Polyphaga
- Infraorder: Scarabaeiformia
- Family: Scarabaeidae
- Genus: Ataenius
- Species: A. confertus

Binomial name
- Ataenius confertus Fall, 1909

Synonyms
- Ataenius cribratus Van Dyke, 1928

Species of beetle

Ataenius confertus is a species of aphodiine dung beetle in the family Scarabaeidae. It is found in the United States (Arizona, New Mexico, Texas) and Mexico (Baja California Sur, Sonora).
