= Ataenius languidus =

Scientific classification
- Kingdom: Animalia
- Phylum: Arthropoda
- Clade: Pancrustacea
- Class: Insecta
- Order: Coleoptera
- Suborder: Polyphaga
- Infraorder: Scarabaeiformia
- Family: Scarabaeidae
- Genus: Ataenius
- Species: A. languidus

Binomial name
- Ataenius languidus Schmidt, 1910

Synonyms
- Ataenius linelli Cartwright, 1944

Species of beetle

Ataenius languidus is a species of beetle of the family Scarabaeidae. It is found in the United States (Alabama, Florida, Texas), the Bahamas, Costa Rica, Guatemala, Honduras, Mexico (Chiapas, Durango, Guerrero, Jalisco, Nuevo León, Oaxaca, Sinaloa, Tamaulipas, Veracruz), Nicaragua, Venezuela and the West Indies.

== Description ==
Adults reach a length of about 4–4.9 mm (0.16–0.19 in). They have an oblong, moderately elongate, medially convex, shining, dark reddish brown to piceous body. The legs are usually reddish brown and the antennae are pale yellow.

== Life history ==
Specimens have occasionally been found in cattle dung.
