= Ataenius elegans =

Scientific classification
- Kingdom: Animalia
- Phylum: Arthropoda
- Clade: Pancrustacea
- Class: Insecta
- Order: Coleoptera
- Suborder: Polyphaga
- Infraorder: Scarabaeiformia
- Family: Scarabaeidae
- Genus: Ataenius
- Species: A. elegans

Binomial name
- Ataenius elegans Harold, 1868

Species of beetle

Ataenius elegans is a species of beetle of the family Scarabaeidae. It is found in Brazil (Mato Grosso do Sul, Minas Gerais, Rio Grande do Sul, Paraíba, Piauí) and Venezuela.

== Description ==
Adults reach a length of about 2.8–3 mm (0.11–0.12 in). They have an elongate-oblong, rusty brown, glabrous, moderately shiny body.

== Life history ==
Specimens have been collected on pastures in cattle excrements.
