= Ataenius carinator =

Scientific classification
- Kingdom: Animalia
- Phylum: Arthropoda
- Clade: Pancrustacea
- Class: Insecta
- Order: Coleoptera
- Suborder: Polyphaga
- Infraorder: Scarabaeiformia
- Family: Scarabaeidae
- Genus: Ataenius
- Species: A. carinator

Binomial name
- Ataenius carinator HAROLD, 1874

Synonyms
- Ataenius vincentiae Arrow, 1903

Species of beetle

Ataenius carinator is a species of aphodiine dung beetle in the family Scarabaeidae. It is found in Bolivia, Brazil (Acre), Colombia, Ecuador, El Salvador, Guyana, Mexico (Tabasco), Panama, Peru, Suriname, Venezuela and the West Indies.
