= Ataenius punctipennis =

Scientific classification
- Kingdom: Animalia
- Phylum: Arthropoda
- Clade: Pancrustacea
- Class: Insecta
- Order: Coleoptera
- Suborder: Polyphaga
- Infraorder: Scarabaeiformia
- Family: Scarabaeidae
- Genus: Ataenius
- Species: A. punctipennis

Binomial name
- Ataenius punctipennis Harold, 1868

Synonyms
- Ataenius subopacus Chapin, 1940

Species of beetle

Ataenius punctipennis is a species of beetle of the family Scarabaeidae. It is found in Argentina, Brazil (Roraima), Colombia, Venezuela and Trinidad & Tobago.

== Description ==
Adults reach a length of about 3.5–4 mm (0.14–0.16 in). They have an oblong oval, alutaceous, dark brown to piceous body, with the apex of the elytra and legs reddish and the elytra finely setaceous.

== Life history ==
Specimens have been collected in woodland on sand and taken from cloud forest litter.
