= Ataenius morator =

Scientific classification
- Kingdom: Animalia
- Phylum: Arthropoda
- Clade: Pancrustacea
- Class: Insecta
- Order: Coleoptera
- Suborder: Polyphaga
- Infraorder: Scarabaeiformia
- Family: Scarabaeidae
- Genus: Ataenius
- Species: A. morator

Binomial name
- Ataenius morator Harold, 1869

Synonyms
- Ataenius insitivus Balthasar, 1961; Ataenius tenebrosus Arrow, 1903; Ataenius picipes Fleutiaux & Sallé, 1889

Species of beetle

Ataenius morator is a species of beetle of the family Scarabaeidae. It is found in Argentina, Bolivia, Brazil (Acre, Amazonas, Bahia, Ceará, Goiás, Maranhão, Mato Grosso, Minas Gerais, Pará, Paraíba, Rio de Janeiro, Rondônia, Roraima, Santa Catarina, São Paulo, Tocantins), Colombia, Ecuador, Guadeloupe, Guyana, Paraguay, Peru, Suriname, Trinidad & Tobago and Venezuela.

== Description ==
Adults reach a length of about 3.8–4.2 mm (0.15–0.17 in). They have a strongly alutaceous, piceous or greyish black, glabrous body. They are uncoated, but sometimes dusted.

== Life history ==
Specimens have been collected in various habitats including mangrove areas, under vegetation, in bovine dung, and in decomposing bananas.
