= Ataenius blapoides =

Scientific classification
- Kingdom: Animalia
- Phylum: Arthropoda
- Clade: Pancrustacea
- Class: Insecta
- Order: Coleoptera
- Suborder: Polyphaga
- Infraorder: Scarabaeiformia
- Family: Scarabaeidae
- Genus: Ataenius
- Species: A. blapoides

Binomial name
- Ataenius blapoides Balthasar, 1947

Species of beetle

Ataenius blapoides is a species of beetle of the family Scarabaeidae. It is found in Brazil (Espírito Santo, Minas Gerais, Rio Grande do Sul, São Paulo) and Paraguay.
