= Ataenius hispaniolae =

Scientific classification
- Kingdom: Animalia
- Phylum: Arthropoda
- Clade: Pancrustacea
- Class: Insecta
- Order: Coleoptera
- Suborder: Polyphaga
- Infraorder: Scarabaeiformia
- Family: Scarabaeidae
- Genus: Ataenius
- Species: A. hispaniolae

Binomial name
- Ataenius hispaniolae Chalumeau, 1982

Species of beetle

Ataenius hispaniolae is a species of beetle of the family Scarabaeidae. It is found in the Dominican Republic and Hispaniola.

== Description ==
Adults reach a length of about 3–3.4 mm (0.12–0.13 in). They have a dark brown body, with the apex of the elytra yellowish, and sometimes with two light brown lateral elytral intervals.
