= Ataenius cavagnaroi =

Scientific classification
- Kingdom: Animalia
- Phylum: Arthropoda
- Clade: Pancrustacea
- Class: Insecta
- Order: Coleoptera
- Suborder: Polyphaga
- Infraorder: Scarabaeiformia
- Family: Scarabaeidae
- Genus: Ataenius
- Species: A. cavagnaroi

Binomial name
- Ataenius cavagnaroi Cartwright, 1970

Species of beetle

Ataenius cavagnaroi is a species of beetle of the family Scarabaeidae. It is found on the Galapagos Islands (Fernandina, Isabela).

== Description ==
Adults reach a length of about 3.3–4.6 mm (0.13–0.18 in) for males and 3.6–4.7 mm (0.14–0.19 in) for females. A flightless morph with reduced wings occurs.

== Life history ==
Specimens have been collected in litter and in the dung of tortoises, cattle and horses.
