= Ataenius gruneri =

Scientific classification
- Kingdom: Animalia
- Phylum: Arthropoda
- Clade: Pancrustacea
- Class: Insecta
- Order: Coleoptera
- Suborder: Polyphaga
- Infraorder: Scarabaeiformia
- Family: Scarabaeidae
- Genus: Ataenius
- Species: A. gruneri

Binomial name
- Ataenius gruneri Chalumeau, 1979

Species of beetle

Ataenius gruneri is a species of beetle of the family Scarabaeidae. It is found in Cuba.

== Description ==
Adults reach a length of about 3.1–3.4 mm (0.12–0.13 in). They have a shining, light brown body, with the elytra lighter than the fore body and with the apex of the elytra minutely setigerous.
