= Ataenius bispinulosus =

Scientific classification
- Kingdom: Animalia
- Phylum: Arthropoda
- Clade: Pancrustacea
- Class: Insecta
- Order: Coleoptera
- Suborder: Polyphaga
- Infraorder: Scarabaeiformia
- Family: Scarabaeidae
- Genus: Ataenius
- Species: A. bispinulosus

Binomial name
- Ataenius bispinulosus Schmidt, 1911

Species of beetle

Ataenius bispinulosus is a species of beetle of the family Scarabaeidae. It is found in Argentina and Paraguay.

== Description ==
Adults reach a length of about 4.5–5 mm (0.18–0.20 in). They have an oblong-oval, carbon black, shiny body, covered with yellowish upright setae.
