= Ataenius balthasari =

Scientific classification
- Kingdom: Animalia
- Phylum: Arthropoda
- Clade: Pancrustacea
- Class: Insecta
- Order: Coleoptera
- Suborder: Polyphaga
- Infraorder: Scarabaeiformia
- Family: Scarabaeidae
- Genus: Ataenius
- Species: A. balthasari

Binomial name
- Ataenius balthasari Petrovitz, 1973

Species of beetle

Ataenius balthasari is a species of beetle of the family Scarabaeidae. It is found in Brazil (Amazonas, Mato Grosso, Roraima).

== Description ==
Adults reach a length of about 3.8–4.5 mm (0.15–0.18 in). They are very similar to Ataenius imbricatus, but the head is relatively larger and has a slightly angulate clypeal margin. Furthermore, the disc of the pronotum lacks coating, is slightly shiny and the punctures are less close. Also, the elytra are relatively longer than in imbricatus.
