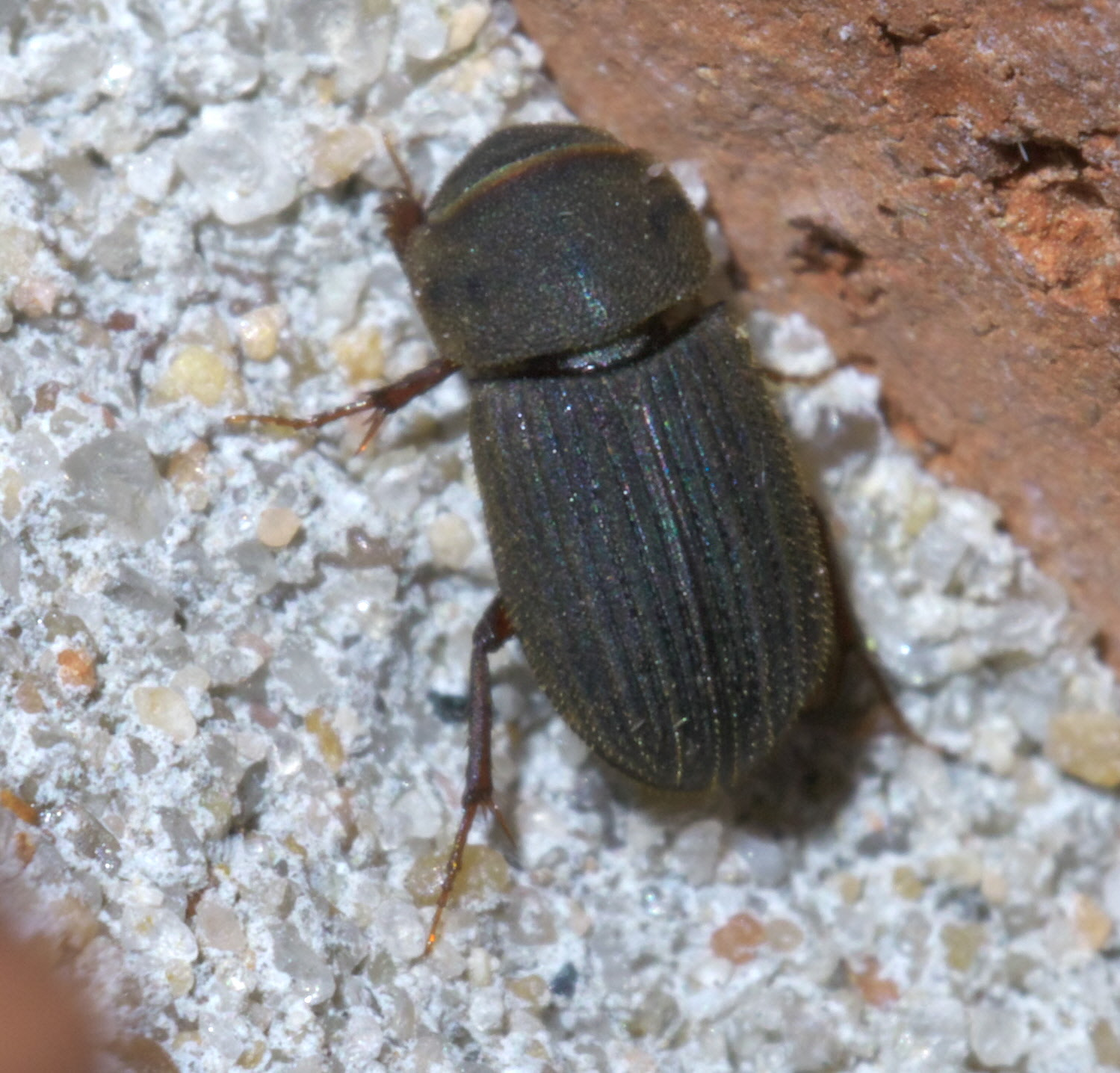

Scientific classification
- Kingdom: Animalia
- Phylum: Arthropoda
- Clade: Pancrustacea
- Class: Insecta
- Order: Coleoptera
- Suborder: Polyphaga
- Infraorder: Scarabaeiformia
- Family: Scarabaeidae
- Genus: Ataenius
- Species: A. imbricatus

Binomial name
- Ataenius imbricatus (Melsheimer, 1845)

Synonyms
- Aphodius imbricatus Melsheimer, 1845; Ataenius sordidus Harold, 1869; Ataenius argillaceus Chevrolat, 1869

= Ataenius imbricatus =

Species of beetle

Ataenius imbricatus is a species of aphodiine dung beetle in the family Scarabaeidae. It is found in the Caribbean, Central America, North America, and South America.

== Description ==
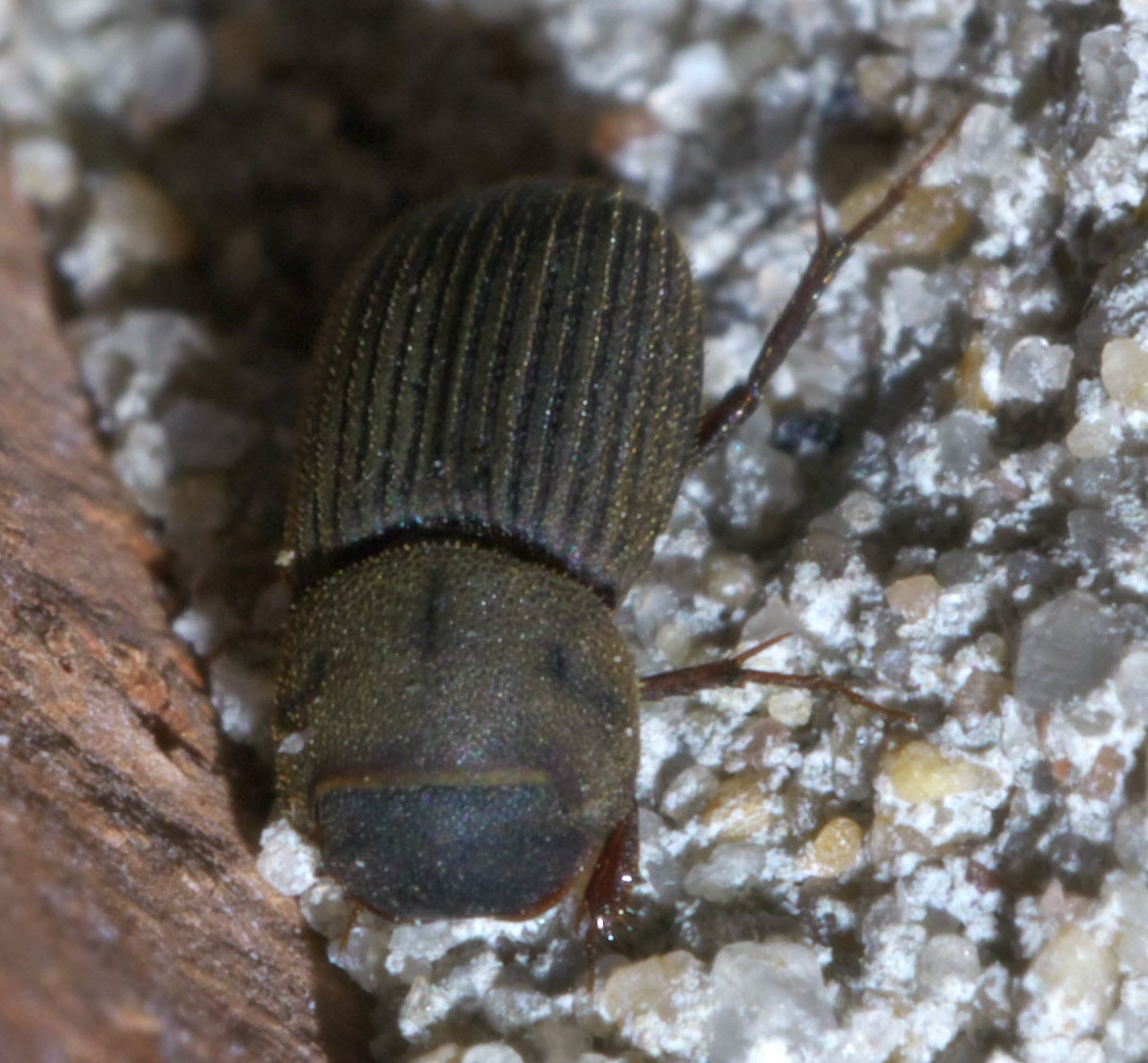

Adults reach a length of about 3.8–4.5 mm (0.15–0.18 in). They have a dull,piceous or reddish piceous body, which is entirely covered by an argillaceous coating and/or with oily dirt.

== Distribution ==
Neotropical: Argentina, Bahamas, Barbados, Belize, Brazil (Alagoas, Bahia, Ceará, Espírito Santo, Maranhão, Mato Grosso, Mato Grosso do Sul, Minas Gerais, Pará, Paraíba, Pernambuco, Roraima, Santa Catarina, São Paulo), Colombia, Costa Rica, Cuba, Dominican Republic, El Salvador, Guadeloupe, Guatemala, Guyana, Honduras, Mexico (Chiapas, Guanajuato, Guerrero, Nayarit, Oaxaca, Quintana Roo, San Luis Potosí, Sinaloa, Tabasco, Veracruz, Yucatán), Nicaragua, Panama, Paraguay, Puerto Rico, Saint Croix, Suriname, Trinidad & Tobago, Venezuela. Nearctic: Canada (Ontario, Quebec), United States (Alabama, Arkansas, Delaware, Florida, Georgia, Illinois, Indiana, Iowa, Kentucky, Louisiana, Maryland, Massachusetts, Michigan, Minnesota, Mississippi, Missouri, Nebraska, New Hampshire, New Jersey, New York, Ohio, Oklahoma, Pennsylvania, South Carolina, South Dakota, Tennessee, Texas, Virginia, West Virginia, Wisconsin).
