= Ataenius forsteri =

Scientific classification
- Kingdom: Animalia
- Phylum: Arthropoda
- Clade: Pancrustacea
- Class: Insecta
- Order: Coleoptera
- Suborder: Polyphaga
- Infraorder: Scarabaeiformia
- Family: Scarabaeidae
- Genus: Ataenius
- Species: A. forsteri

Binomial name
- Ataenius forsteri Balthasar, 1960

Species of beetle

Ataenius forsteri is a species of beetle of the family Scarabaeidae. It is found in Argentina, Bolivia, Brazil (Distrito Federal, Espírito Santo, Goiás, Maranhão, Mato Grosso, Mato Grosso do Sul, Minas Gerais, Paraíba, Piauí, Rio de Janeiro, Rio Grande do Norte, Santa Catarina, São Paulo), Paraguay and Venezuela.

== Description ==
Adults reach a length of about 3.8–4 mm (0.15–0.16 in). They are nearly identical to Ataenius sculptilis, but lack clypeal denticles and have somewhat larger and less dense punctures on the pronotum and ventral surface.

== Life history ==
Specimens have been collected in cattle excrements on pastures.
