= Ataenius sculptilis =

Scientific classification
- Kingdom: Animalia
- Phylum: Arthropoda
- Clade: Pancrustacea
- Class: Insecta
- Order: Coleoptera
- Suborder: Polyphaga
- Infraorder: Scarabaeiformia
- Family: Scarabaeidae
- Genus: Ataenius
- Species: A. sculptilis

Binomial name
- Ataenius sculptilis Harold, 1868

Species of beetle

Ataenius sculptilis is a species of beetle of the family Scarabaeidae. It is found in Argentina, Bolivia, Brazil (Acre, Amazonas, Bahia, Espírito Santo, Mato Grosso, Mato Grosso do Sul, Minas Gerais, Piauí, Rondônia, Roraima, Santa Catarina, São Paulo), Colombia, Paraguay, Peru, Trinidad & Tobago, Venezuela, the Virgin Islands and Puerto Rico.

== Description ==
Adults reach a length of about 3.8–4 mm (0.15–0.16 in). They have an elongate-oblong, piceous, glabrous and moderately shiny body.

== Life history ==
Specimens have been collected in tropical transition forest, on wet grassland and in bovine dung on pasture areas.
