= Ataenius oklahomensis =

Scientific classification
- Kingdom: Animalia
- Phylum: Arthropoda
- Clade: Pancrustacea
- Class: Insecta
- Order: Coleoptera
- Suborder: Polyphaga
- Infraorder: Scarabaeiformia
- Family: Scarabaeidae
- Genus: Ataenius
- Species: A. oklahomensis

Binomial name
- Ataenius oklahomensis Brown, 1930

Species of beetle

Ataenius oklahomensis is a species of beetle of the family Scarabaeidae. It is found in the United States (Arkansas, Louisiana, Oklahoma, Texas).

== Description ==
Adults reach a length of about 3.5–4.4 mm (0.14–0.17 in). They are very similar to Ataenius ovatulus, but the pronotum is densely, uniformly punctate over the outer third, the posterior angles are distinctly excised or emarginate and the base is sinuate. The elytral intervals are strongly convex to subcarinate in the posterior third.

== Taxonomy ==
Ataenius oklahomensis may represent a geographical form of Ataenius ovatulus, because the male genitalia of both species do not differ in shape.
