= Ataenius ovatulus =

Scientific classification
- Kingdom: Animalia
- Phylum: Arthropoda
- Clade: Pancrustacea
- Class: Insecta
- Order: Coleoptera
- Suborder: Polyphaga
- Infraorder: Scarabaeiformia
- Family: Scarabaeidae
- Genus: Ataenius
- Species: A. ovatulus

Binomial name
- Ataenius ovatulus Horn, 1871

Synonyms
- Ataenius lecontei Harold, 1874; Aphodius lepidus Schmidt, 1908

Species of beetle

Ataenius ovatulus is a species of aphodiine dung beetle in the family Scarabaeidae. It is found in the United States (Alabama, Arkansas, Delaware, Florida, Georgia, Illinois, Indiana, Kentucky, Louisiana, Maryland, Mississippi, North Carolina, South Carolina, Tennessee, Texas, Virginia).

== Description ==
Adults reach a length of about 3–4 mm (0.12–0.16 in). They have an elongate oval, convex, shining, dark reddish brown to piceous body, with the anterior of the clypeus and legs reddish brown.

== Life history ==
Specimens are often found at the bases of large trees in open fields, but have also been taken from litter beneath plaster bags on the ground.
