= Ataenius pseudousingeri =

Scientific classification
- Kingdom: Animalia
- Phylum: Arthropoda
- Clade: Pancrustacea
- Class: Insecta
- Order: Coleoptera
- Suborder: Polyphaga
- Infraorder: Scarabaeiformia
- Family: Scarabaeidae
- Genus: Ataenius
- Species: A. pseudousingeri

Binomial name
- Ataenius pseudousingeri Galante, Stebnicka & Verdu, 2003

Species of beetle

Ataenius pseudousingeri is a species of beetle of the family Scarabaeidae. It is found in Guatemala and Mexico (Chiapas, Oaxaca).

== Description ==
Adults reach a length of about 3.2–3.8 mm (0.13–0.15 in). They are similar to Ataenius usingeri, but may be distinguished by the smaller body, the dentate clypeal margin and the lighter elytra, which are usually red or light castaneous, with deeper striae and coarser punctures.
