= Ataenius usingeri =

Scientific classification
- Kingdom: Animalia
- Phylum: Arthropoda
- Clade: Pancrustacea
- Class: Insecta
- Order: Coleoptera
- Suborder: Polyphaga
- Infraorder: Scarabaeiformia
- Family: Scarabaeidae
- Genus: Ataenius
- Species: A. usingeri

Binomial name
- Ataenius usingeri Hinton, 1936

Species of beetle

Ataenius usingeri is a species of beetle of the family Scarabaeidae. It is found in Belize, Costa Rica, El Salvador, Guatemala, Honduras, Mexico (Campeche, Chiapas, Jalisco, México, Morelos, Oaxaca, Puebla, Quintana Roo, Tamaulipas, Veracruz, Yucatán) and Panama.

== Description ==
Adults reach a length of about 3.6–4.5 mm (0.14–0.18 in). They have a parallel-sided, shining black or piceous body.

== Life history ==
Specimens have been collected in sheep droppings and in leaf litter of thorny shrubs.
