= Ataenius beattyi =

Scientific classification
- Kingdom: Animalia
- Phylum: Arthropoda
- Clade: Pancrustacea
- Class: Insecta
- Order: Coleoptera
- Suborder: Polyphaga
- Infraorder: Scarabaeiformia
- Family: Scarabaeidae
- Genus: Ataenius
- Species: A. beattyi

Binomial name
- Ataenius beattyi Chapin, 1940

Species of beetle

Ataenius beattyi is a species of beetle of the family Scarabaeidae. It is found in Barbados, Desirade, the Dominican Republic, Guadeloupe, Jamaica and the Virgin Islands.

== Description ==
Adults reach a length of about 3.5–4 mm (0.14–0.16 in). They are very similar to Ataenius steinheili and might just represents a geographic, insular form. It differs from steinheili only slightly by having the pronotal punctures larger and closer, while the male genitalia of both species do not reveal any visible differences.
