= Ataenius steinheili =

Scientific classification
- Kingdom: Animalia
- Phylum: Arthropoda
- Clade: Pancrustacea
- Class: Insecta
- Order: Coleoptera
- Suborder: Polyphaga
- Infraorder: Scarabaeiformia
- Family: Scarabaeidae
- Genus: Ataenius
- Species: A. steinheili

Binomial name
- Ataenius steinheili Harold, 1874

Synonyms
- Ataenius grenadensis Chalumeau, 1982

Species of beetle

Ataenius steinheili is a species of beetle of the family Scarabaeidae. It is found in Colombia, Grenada, Mexico (Campeche, Quintana Roo, Veracruz, Yucatán), Trinidad & Tobago and Venezuela.

== Description ==
Adults reach a length of about 3.5–4 mm (0.14–0.16 in). They have a convex, piceous, weakly shiny body.
