= Ataenius hesperius =

Scientific classification
- Kingdom: Animalia
- Phylum: Arthropoda
- Clade: Pancrustacea
- Class: Insecta
- Order: Coleoptera
- Suborder: Polyphaga
- Infraorder: Scarabaeiformia
- Family: Scarabaeidae
- Genus: Ataenius
- Species: A. hesperius

Binomial name
- Ataenius hesperius Cartwright, 1974

Species of beetle

Ataenius hesperius is a species of aphodiine dung beetle in the family Scarabaeidae. It is found in the United States (Arizona, California, Colorado, Texas). It is closely related to Ataenius texanus, but it tends to live more west.
