= Ataenius texanus =

Scientific classification
- Kingdom: Animalia
- Phylum: Arthropoda
- Clade: Pancrustacea
- Class: Insecta
- Order: Coleoptera
- Suborder: Polyphaga
- Infraorder: Scarabaeiformia
- Family: Scarabaeidae
- Genus: Ataenius
- Species: A. texanus

Binomial name
- Ataenius texanus Harold, 1874

Synonyms
- Ataenius punctifrons Cartwright, 1974

Species of beetle

Ataenius texanus is a species of aphodiine dung beetle in the family Scarabaeidae. It is found in the United States (Colorado, Iowa, Kansas, Minnesota, North Dakota, Ohio, Oklahoma, Texas), Mexico (Baja California, Chiapas, Coahuila, Jalisco, Oaxaca, Veracruz), Panama and the West Indies. It is closely related to Ataenius hesperius, which tends to live more west.
