= Ataenius heinekeni =

Scientific classification
- Kingdom: Animalia
- Phylum: Arthropoda
- Clade: Pancrustacea
- Class: Insecta
- Order: Coleoptera
- Suborder: Polyphaga
- Infraorder: Scarabaeiformia
- Family: Scarabaeidae
- Genus: Ataenius
- Species: A. heinekeni

Binomial name
- Ataenius heinekeni (Wollaston, 1854)

Synonyms
- Oxyomus heinekeni Wollaston, 1854; Ataenius floridanus Brown, 1930; Ataenius solitarius Blatchley, 1928; Ataenius vexator Harold, 1869; Auperia rhyticephala Chevrolat, 1865

Species of beetle

Ataenius heinekeni is a species of beetle of the family Scarabaeidae. It is found in the United States (Florida, South Carolina, Texas), the Bahamas, Cuba, Hispaniola, Madeira, Mexico (Nayarit, Veracruz), Puerto Rico, the Virgin Islands, as well as in France and Italy.

== Description ==
Adults reach a length of about 4.3–5.5 mm (0.17–0.22 in). They have a piceous to black, moderately shining, often microreticulate, parallel-sided body.

== Life history ==
Specimens have been found under leaves and logs on hard ground, under live-oak trees, on old rice-field dams, as well as under roadside debris.
