= Ataenius apicalis =

Scientific classification
- Kingdom: Animalia
- Phylum: Arthropoda
- Clade: Pancrustacea
- Class: Insecta
- Order: Coleoptera
- Suborder: Polyphaga
- Infraorder: Scarabaeiformia
- Family: Scarabaeidae
- Genus: Ataenius
- Species: A. apicalis

Binomial name
- Ataenius apicalis Hinton, 1936

Species of beetle

Ataenius apicalis is a species of beetle of the family Scarabaeidae. It is found in Mexico (Chiapas, Jalisco, Oaxaca, Sinaloa, Tabasco, Veracruz) and in the United States (Alabama, Florida, Georgia, Louisiana, Maryland, Michigan, Mississippi, Nebraska, Ohio, South Carolina, Texas, Virginia).

== Description ==
Adults reach a length of about 4–5 mm (0.16–0.20 in). They have a moderately convex, oblong, shiny black body.

== Life history ==
Specimens have been collected in raccoon and cow dung and human feces in swamp forests, Typha marshes, as well as in fungi and in rainforest litter.
