= Ataenius schmidti =

Scientific classification
- Kingdom: Animalia
- Phylum: Arthropoda
- Clade: Pancrustacea
- Class: Insecta
- Order: Coleoptera
- Suborder: Polyphaga
- Infraorder: Scarabaeiformia
- Family: Scarabaeidae
- Genus: Ataenius
- Species: A. schmidti

Binomial name
- Ataenius schmidti Stebnicka, 2003

Synonyms
- Ataenius argillaceus Schmidt, 1917 (preocc.)

Species of beetle

Ataenius schmidti is a species of beetle of the family Scarabaeidae. It is found in Argentina, Brazil (Amazonas, Mato Grosso, Mato Grosso do Sul, Rio Grande do Sul, Roraima) and Paraguay.

== Description ==
Adults reach a length of about 3.8–4 mm (0.15–0.16 in). They have a piceous or greyish black body, partially or entirely covered with an argillaceous coating or dust. The clypeal margin and legs are reddish-brown.

== Life history ==
Specimens have been collected in wet grasslands and on pastures.
