= Ataenius setiger =

Scientific classification
- Kingdom: Animalia
- Phylum: Arthropoda
- Clade: Pancrustacea
- Class: Insecta
- Order: Coleoptera
- Suborder: Polyphaga
- Infraorder: Scarabaeiformia
- Family: Scarabaeidae
- Genus: Ataenius
- Species: A. setiger

Binomial name
- Ataenius setiger Bates, 1887

Synonyms
- Ataenius pseudohirsutus Cartwright, 1974

Species of beetle

Ataenius setiger is a species of aphodiine dung beetle in the family Scarabaeidae. It is found in Mexico (Baja California Sur, Guerrero, Morelos, Nayarit, Oaxaca, Puebla, Quintana Roo, San Luis Potosí, Sonora, Tamaulipas, Veracruz) and the United States (Arizona, Texas).

== Description ==
Adults reach a length of about 3.8–4.6 mm (0.15–0.18 in). They have an oblong, convex, piceous, moderately shiny body.

== Life history ==
Specimens have been collected in open meadows.
