= Ataenius floreanae =

Scientific classification
- Kingdom: Animalia
- Phylum: Arthropoda
- Clade: Pancrustacea
- Class: Insecta
- Order: Coleoptera
- Suborder: Polyphaga
- Infraorder: Scarabaeiformia
- Family: Scarabaeidae
- Genus: Ataenius
- Species: A. floreanae

Binomial name
- Ataenius floreanae Cook & Peck, 2000

Species of beetle

Ataenius floreanae is a species of beetle of the family Scarabaeidae. It is found on the Galapagos Islands (Floreana).

== Description ==
Adults reach a length of about 4.1–4.7 mm (0.16–0.19 in) for males and 4.4–4.8 mm (0.17–0.19 in) for females. They have a moderately convex, shining, dark brown to black body, with the edge of the clypeus and legs dark reddish-brown and the antennae paler.

== Life history ==
Specimens have been collected in cow dung.

== Etymology ==
The name of the species refers to the island of Floreana, where it occurs.
