= Ataenius stephani =

Scientific classification
- Kingdom: Animalia
- Phylum: Arthropoda
- Clade: Pancrustacea
- Class: Insecta
- Order: Coleoptera
- Suborder: Polyphaga
- Infraorder: Scarabaeiformia
- Family: Scarabaeidae
- Genus: Ataenius
- Species: A. stephani

Binomial name
- Ataenius stephani Cartwright, 1974

Species of beetle

Ataenius stephani is a species of aphodiine dung beetle in the family Scarabaeidae. It is found in the United States (Arizona) and Mexico (Baja California, Jalisco, Nayarit, Sinaloa, Sonora).

== Description ==
Adults reach a length of about 4.8–5.2 mm (0.19–0.20 in). They have an oblong, shiny, black body, with the legs and sometimes the margins of the pronotum reddish brown.

== Life history ==
Specimens have been collected in riparian habitats and is common in lawns.
