= Ataenius semicornutus =

Scientific classification
- Kingdom: Animalia
- Phylum: Arthropoda
- Clade: Pancrustacea
- Class: Insecta
- Order: Coleoptera
- Suborder: Polyphaga
- Infraorder: Scarabaeiformia
- Family: Scarabaeidae
- Genus: Ataenius
- Species: A. semicornutus

Binomial name
- Ataenius semicornutus (MacLeay, 1871)

Synonyms
- Ammoecius semicornutus MacLeay, 1871

Species of beetle

Ataenius semicornutus is a species of beetle of the family Scarabaeidae. It is found in Australia (Northern Territory, Queensland, South Australia, New South Wales).

== Description ==
Adults reach a length of about 3.8–4.5 mm (0.15–0.18 in). They have an elongate, parallel-sided, slightly convex, shining, dark red-brown to black body, with the anterior of the clypeus and legs reddish.
