= Ataenius glabriventris =

Scientific classification
- Kingdom: Animalia
- Phylum: Arthropoda
- Clade: Pancrustacea
- Class: Insecta
- Order: Coleoptera
- Suborder: Polyphaga
- Infraorder: Scarabaeiformia
- Family: Scarabaeidae
- Genus: Ataenius
- Species: A. glabriventris

Binomial name
- Ataenius glabriventris Schmidt, 1911

Species of beetle

Ataenius glabriventris is a species of beetle of the family Scarabaeidae. It is found in Colombia, Costa Rica, El Salvador, Guatemala, Honduras, Mexico (Oaxaca, Veracruz), Panama and Venezuela.

== Description ==
Adults reach a length of about 4–5.8 mm (0.16–0.23 in). They have an elongate-oblong, strongly shiny, black body.

== Life history ==
Specimens have been collected in open forests.
