= Ataenius palmerstoni =

Scientific classification
- Kingdom: Animalia
- Phylum: Arthropoda
- Clade: Pancrustacea
- Class: Insecta
- Order: Coleoptera
- Suborder: Polyphaga
- Infraorder: Scarabaeiformia
- Family: Scarabaeidae
- Genus: Ataenius
- Species: A. palmerstoni

Binomial name
- Ataenius palmerstoni Blackburn, 1891

Synonyms
- Ataenius moniliatus Blackburn, 1904

Species of beetle

Ataenius palmerstoni is a species of beetle of the family Scarabaeidae. It is found in Australia (Northern Territory, Queensland).

== Description ==
Adults reach a length of about 5.2–6 mm (0.20–0.24 in). They have an oblong-oval, convex, greyish-black to piceous body, often with areas covered with an argillaceous coating.
