= Ataenius impressus =

Scientific classification
- Kingdom: Animalia
- Phylum: Arthropoda
- Clade: Pancrustacea
- Class: Insecta
- Order: Coleoptera
- Suborder: Polyphaga
- Infraorder: Scarabaeiformia
- Family: Scarabaeidae
- Genus: Ataenius
- Species: A. impressus

Binomial name
- Ataenius impressus (Petrovitz, 1963)

Synonyms
- Dialytes impressus Petrovitz, 1963

Species of beetle

Ataenius impressus is a species of beetle of the family Scarabaeidae. It is found in Bolivia and Brazil (Goiás, Mato Grosso, Minas Gerais).

== Description ==
Adults reach a length of about 4–4.5 mm (0.16–0.18 in). They have a piceous body, almost entirely covered with a greyish argillaceous coating.
