= Ataenius nigricans =

Scientific classification
- Kingdom: Animalia
- Phylum: Arthropoda
- Clade: Pancrustacea
- Class: Insecta
- Order: Coleoptera
- Suborder: Polyphaga
- Infraorder: Scarabaeiformia
- Family: Scarabaeidae
- Genus: Ataenius
- Species: A. nigricans

Binomial name
- Ataenius nigricans Paulian, 1933

Species of beetle

Ataenius nigricans is a species of beetle of the family Scarabaeidae. It is found in Indonesia (Sumatra, Java), Malaysia, Thailand and Vietnam.

== Description ==
Adults reach a length of about 3.7–4.3 mm (0.15–0.17 in). They have a moderately convex, oblong-oval, glabrous, fairly shiny, black or blackish-brown body, with reddish-brown legs.
