= Ataenius sparsicollis =

Scientific classification
- Kingdom: Animalia
- Phylum: Arthropoda
- Clade: Pancrustacea
- Class: Insecta
- Order: Coleoptera
- Suborder: Polyphaga
- Infraorder: Scarabaeiformia
- Family: Scarabaeidae
- Genus: Ataenius
- Species: A. sparsicollis

Binomial name
- Ataenius sparsicollis Blackburn, 1904

Species of beetle

Ataenius sparsicollis is a species of beetle of the family Scarabaeidae. It is found in Australia (Northern Territory, Queensland, South Australia, New South Wales).

== Description ==
Adults reach a length of about 3.8–4.5 mm (0.15–0.18 in). They have an elongate, parallel-sided, alutaceous, reddish-black to black body, with the anterior of the clypeus reddish.
