= Ataenius murchisoni =

Scientific classification
- Kingdom: Animalia
- Phylum: Arthropoda
- Clade: Pancrustacea
- Class: Insecta
- Order: Coleoptera
- Suborder: Polyphaga
- Infraorder: Scarabaeiformia
- Family: Scarabaeidae
- Genus: Ataenius
- Species: A. murchisoni

Binomial name
- Ataenius murchisoni Stebnicka & Howden, 1997

Species of beetle

Ataenius murchisoni is a species of beetle of the family Scarabaeidae. It is found in Australia (Northern Territory, Western Australia).

== Description ==
Adults reach a length of about 4–5.5 mm (0.16–0.22 in). They have an elongate-oval, convex, shining, light castaneous to black body, with yellow setae. The head and pronotum are usually darker than the elytra.
