= Ataenius gungareei =

Scientific classification
- Kingdom: Animalia
- Phylum: Arthropoda
- Clade: Pancrustacea
- Class: Insecta
- Order: Coleoptera
- Suborder: Polyphaga
- Infraorder: Scarabaeiformia
- Family: Scarabaeidae
- Genus: Ataenius
- Species: A. gungareei

Binomial name
- Ataenius gungareei Stebnicka & Howden, 1997

Species of beetle

Ataenius gungareei is a species of beetle of the family Scarabaeidae. It is found in Australia (Northern Territory).

== Description ==
Adults reach a length of about 3–3.5 mm (0.12–0.14 in). They have an elongate-oval, convex, slightly shining, partly finely pubescent, dark brown body. The margin of the clypeus and the legs are yellowish-brown.
