= Ataenius chinacotae =

Scientific classification
- Kingdom: Animalia
- Phylum: Arthropoda
- Clade: Pancrustacea
- Class: Insecta
- Order: Coleoptera
- Suborder: Polyphaga
- Infraorder: Scarabaeiformia
- Family: Scarabaeidae
- Genus: Ataenius
- Species: A. chinacotae

Binomial name
- Ataenius chinacotae Stebnicka, 2007

Species of beetle

Ataenius chinacotae is a species of beetle of the family Scarabaeidae. It is found in Bolivia, Colombia, Costa Rica, Ecuador and Panama.

== Description ==
Adults reach a length of about 4.5–4.7 mm (0.18–0.19 in). They have an elongate, parallel-sided, shining, glabrous body. They are dark brown to carbon black.
