= Ataenius excisicollis =

Scientific classification
- Kingdom: Animalia
- Phylum: Arthropoda
- Clade: Pancrustacea
- Class: Insecta
- Order: Coleoptera
- Suborder: Polyphaga
- Infraorder: Scarabaeiformia
- Family: Scarabaeidae
- Genus: Ataenius
- Species: A. excisicollis

Binomial name
- Ataenius excisicollis Petrovitz, 1961

Species of beetle

Ataenius excisicollis is a species of beetle of the family Scarabaeidae. It is found in Australia (Northern Territory, Queensland).

== Description ==
Adults reach a length of about 4–4.8 mm (0.16–0.19 in). They have an elongate, glabrous, slightly alutaceous, piceous body, with the anterior of the clypeus and legs dark reddish-brown.
