= Ataenius humptydooensis =

Scientific classification
- Kingdom: Animalia
- Phylum: Arthropoda
- Clade: Pancrustacea
- Class: Insecta
- Order: Coleoptera
- Suborder: Polyphaga
- Infraorder: Scarabaeiformia
- Family: Scarabaeidae
- Genus: Ataenius
- Species: A. humptydooensis

Binomial name
- Ataenius humptydooensis Stebnicka & Howden, 1997

Species of beetle

Ataenius humptydooensis is a species of beetle of the family Scarabaeidae. It is found in Australia (Northern Territory, Queensland).

== Description ==
Adults reach a length of about 2.8–3 mm (0.11–0.12 in). They have an elongate-oval, convex, plump, moderately shining, partly pubescent, light reddish-brown body.
