= Ataenius tarumensis =

Scientific classification
- Kingdom: Animalia
- Phylum: Arthropoda
- Clade: Pancrustacea
- Class: Insecta
- Order: Coleoptera
- Suborder: Polyphaga
- Infraorder: Scarabaeiformia
- Family: Scarabaeidae
- Genus: Ataenius
- Species: A. tarumensis

Binomial name
- Ataenius tarumensis Stebnicka, 2007

Species of beetle

Ataenius tarumensis is a species of beetle of the family Scarabaeidae. It is found in Brazil (Amazonas).

== Description ==
Adults reach a length of about 2.5–2.8 mm (0.098–0.110 in). They have an oblong oval,moderately shining, glabrous, light castaneous body, with the ventral surface and legs lighter than the dorsal surface.
