= Ataenius pseudoclavatus =

Scientific classification
- Kingdom: Animalia
- Phylum: Arthropoda
- Clade: Pancrustacea
- Class: Insecta
- Order: Coleoptera
- Suborder: Polyphaga
- Infraorder: Scarabaeiformia
- Family: Scarabaeidae
- Genus: Ataenius
- Species: A. pseudoclavatus

Binomial name
- Ataenius pseudoclavatus Stebnicka, 2005

Species of beetle

Ataenius pseudoclavatus is a species of beetle of the family Scarabaeidae. It is found in Argentina.

== Description ==
Adults reach a length of about 5–5.2 mm (0.20–0.20 in). They have an elongate oblong, convex, almost opaque, dark castaneous to piceous body, with the femora reddish brown.
