= Ataenius quintanaroo =

Scientific classification
- Kingdom: Animalia
- Phylum: Arthropoda
- Clade: Pancrustacea
- Class: Insecta
- Order: Coleoptera
- Suborder: Polyphaga
- Infraorder: Scarabaeiformia
- Family: Scarabaeidae
- Genus: Ataenius
- Species: A. quintanaroo

Binomial name
- Ataenius quintanaroo Stebnicka, 2006

Species of beetle

Ataenius quintanaroo is a species of beetle of the family Scarabaeidae. It is found in Mexico (Chiapas, Quintana Roo, Yucatán).

== Description ==
Adults reach a length of about 5–6 mm (0.20–0.24 in). They have an elongate-oval, convex, moderately shiny, black and glabrous body.
