= Ataenius ceylonensis =

Scientific classification
- Kingdom: Animalia
- Phylum: Arthropoda
- Clade: Pancrustacea
- Class: Insecta
- Order: Coleoptera
- Suborder: Polyphaga
- Infraorder: Scarabaeiformia
- Family: Scarabaeidae
- Genus: Ataenius
- Species: A. ceylonensis

Binomial name
- Ataenius ceylonensis Schmidt, 1912

Species of beetle

Ataenius ceylonensis is a species of beetle of the family Scarabaeidae. It is found in Sri Lanka.

== Description ==
Adults reach a length of about 5–5.5 mm (0.20–0.22 in). They have an elongate-parallel, shiny, glabrous body. The forebody is black, while the elytra are blackish-brown.
