= Ataenius montanus =

Scientific classification
- Kingdom: Animalia
- Phylum: Arthropoda
- Clade: Pancrustacea
- Class: Insecta
- Order: Coleoptera
- Suborder: Polyphaga
- Infraorder: Scarabaeiformia
- Family: Scarabaeidae
- Genus: Ataenius
- Species: A. montanus

Binomial name
- Ataenius montanus Schmidt, 1910

Synonyms
- Ataenius grossepunctatus Petrovitz, 1976

Species of beetle

Ataenius montanus is a species of beetle of the family Scarabaeidae. It is found in Ecuador and Peru.

== Description ==
Adults reach a length of about 4.5 mm (0.18 in). They have an oblong, parallel-sided, slightly convex, black body.
