= Ataenius crenaticollis =

Scientific classification
- Kingdom: Animalia
- Phylum: Arthropoda
- Clade: Pancrustacea
- Class: Insecta
- Order: Coleoptera
- Suborder: Polyphaga
- Infraorder: Scarabaeiformia
- Family: Scarabaeidae
- Genus: Ataenius
- Species: A. crenaticollis

Binomial name
- Ataenius crenaticollis Petrovitz, 1973

Species of beetle

Ataenius crenaticollis is a species of beetle of the family Scarabaeidae. It is found in Brazil (Amazonas) and Peru.

== Description ==
Adults reach a length of about 4.5–5 mm (0.18–0.20 in). They have an elongate, moderately convex, piceous and shining body.
