= Ataenius corporaali =

Scientific classification
- Kingdom: Animalia
- Phylum: Arthropoda
- Clade: Pancrustacea
- Class: Insecta
- Order: Coleoptera
- Suborder: Polyphaga
- Infraorder: Scarabaeiformia
- Family: Scarabaeidae
- Genus: Ataenius
- Species: A. corporaali

Binomial name
- Ataenius corporaali Boucomont, 1924

Species of beetle

Ataenius corporaali is a species of beetle of the family Scarabaeidae. It is found in Indonesia (Sumatra).

== Description ==
Adults reach a length of about 3.5 mm (0.14 in). They have an elongate, parallel-sided, glabrous, shiny, reddish-brown body.
