= Ataenius huanus =

Scientific classification
- Kingdom: Animalia
- Phylum: Arthropoda
- Clade: Pancrustacea
- Class: Insecta
- Order: Coleoptera
- Suborder: Polyphaga
- Infraorder: Scarabaeiformia
- Family: Scarabaeidae
- Genus: Ataenius
- Species: A. huanus

Binomial name
- Ataenius huanus Stebnicka, 2007

Species of beetle

Ataenius huanus is a species of beetle of the family Scarabaeidae. It is found in Ecuador and Peru.

== Description ==
Adults reach a length of about 3.9–4 mm (0.15–0.16 in). They have an elongate, slender, moderately shining, piceous body.
