= Ataenius michelii =

Scientific classification
- Kingdom: Animalia
- Phylum: Arthropoda
- Clade: Pancrustacea
- Class: Insecta
- Order: Coleoptera
- Suborder: Polyphaga
- Infraorder: Scarabaeiformia
- Family: Scarabaeidae
- Genus: Ataenius
- Species: A. michelii

Binomial name
- Ataenius michelii Chalumeau, 1978

Species of beetle

Ataenius michelii is a species of beetle of the family Scarabaeidae. It is found in Puerto Rico.

== Description ==
Adults reach a length of about 3.7–3.9 mm (0.15–0.15 in). They have an oblong-oval, shining, black body.
