= Heteronyx pumilus =

Scientific classification
- Kingdom: Animalia
- Phylum: Arthropoda
- Clade: Pancrustacea
- Class: Insecta
- Order: Coleoptera
- Suborder: Polyphaga
- Infraorder: Scarabaeiformia
- Family: Scarabaeidae
- Genus: Heteronyx
- Species: H. pumilus

Binomial name
- Heteronyx pumilus Sharp, 1877

Synonyms
- Heteronyx brevicornis Blackburn, 1889

Species of beetle

Heteronyx pumilus is a species of beetle of the family Scarabaeidae. It is found in Australia (New South Wales, South Australia, Western Australia).

== Description ==
Adults reach a length of about 4–4.5 mm (0.16–0.18 in). They are pale testaceous and very similar to Heteronyx pygmaeus, but with a shining surface. There are short setae on the pronotum and elytra.
