= Heteronyx concolor =

Scientific classification
- Kingdom: Animalia
- Phylum: Arthropoda
- Clade: Pancrustacea
- Class: Insecta
- Order: Coleoptera
- Suborder: Polyphaga
- Infraorder: Scarabaeiformia
- Family: Scarabaeidae
- Genus: Heteronyx
- Species: H. concolor

Binomial name
- Heteronyx concolor MacLeay, 1871

Synonyms
- Heteronyx pauper Blackburn, 1910; Heteronyx puer Blackburn, 1910; Heteronyx suturalis Blackburn, 1895; Heteronyx cowelli Blackburn, 1894; Heteronyx oscillator Blackburn, 1890; Heteronyx sparsus Blackburn, 1889

Species of beetle

Heteronyx concolor is a species of beetle of the family Scarabaeidae. It is found in Australia (Queensland, Northern Territory, South Australia).

== Description ==
Adults reach a length of about 7 mm (0.28 in). They are pale castaneous. The upper half of the pygidium is dull, while the lower half is shining. There are setae on the discs of both the pronotum and elytra.
