= Heteronyx tristis =

Scientific classification
- Kingdom: Animalia
- Phylum: Arthropoda
- Clade: Pancrustacea
- Class: Insecta
- Order: Coleoptera
- Suborder: Polyphaga
- Infraorder: Scarabaeiformia
- Family: Scarabaeidae
- Genus: Heteronyx
- Species: H. tristis

Binomial name
- Heteronyx tristis Blackburn, 1888

Species of beetle

Heteronyx tristis is a species of beetle of the family Scarabaeidae. It is found in Australia (Victoria, South Australia, Western Australia).

== Description ==
Adults reach a length of about 13 mm (0.51 in). The dorsal surface is dark castaneous to black, shining and covered with short, pale setae.
