= Heteronyx johannis =

Scientific classification
- Kingdom: Animalia
- Phylum: Arthropoda
- Clade: Pancrustacea
- Class: Insecta
- Order: Coleoptera
- Suborder: Polyphaga
- Infraorder: Scarabaeiformia
- Family: Scarabaeidae
- Genus: Heteronyx
- Species: H. johannis

Binomial name
- Heteronyx johannis Blackburn, 1912

Species of beetle

Heteronyx johannis is a species of beetle of the family Scarabaeidae. It is found in Australia (South Australia).

== Description ==
Adults reach a length of about 8–10 mm (0.31–0.39 in). The head, pronotum, scutellum and ventral surface are pale castaneous, while the elytra are piceous and dull. The pygidium is castaneous, but darkened towards the base. The whole dorsal surface is very densely but finely punctured.
