= Heteronyx elongatus =

Scientific classification
- Kingdom: Animalia
- Phylum: Arthropoda
- Clade: Pancrustacea
- Class: Insecta
- Order: Coleoptera
- Suborder: Polyphaga
- Infraorder: Scarabaeiformia
- Family: Scarabaeidae
- Genus: Heteronyx
- Species: H. elongatus

Binomial name
- Heteronyx elongatus Blanchard, 1850

Synonyms
- Heteronyx elongatulus Blackburn, 1909; Heteronyx monticola Blackburn, 1909

Species of beetle

Heteronyx elongatus is a species of beetle of the family Scarabaeidae. It is found in Australia (New South Wales, Victoria, South Australia, Tasmania).

== Description ==
Adults reach a length of about 12–14 mm (0.47–0.55 in).
