= Heteronyx incognitus =

Scientific classification
- Kingdom: Animalia
- Phylum: Arthropoda
- Clade: Pancrustacea
- Class: Insecta
- Order: Coleoptera
- Suborder: Polyphaga
- Infraorder: Scarabaeiformia
- Family: Scarabaeidae
- Genus: Heteronyx
- Species: H. incognitus

Binomial name
- Heteronyx incognitus Blackburn, 1892

Synonyms
- Heteronyx punctipes Blackburn, 1909

Species of beetle

Heteronyx incognitus is a species of beetle of the family Scarabaeidae. It is found in Australia (New South Wales, Australian Capital Territory, Victoria, Queensland).

== Description ==
Adults reach a length of about 8–9 mm (0.31–0.35 in). They are pale castaneous. The disc of the pronotum is uniformly punctured.
