= Heteronyx praecox =

Scientific classification
- Kingdom: Animalia
- Phylum: Arthropoda
- Clade: Pancrustacea
- Class: Insecta
- Order: Coleoptera
- Suborder: Polyphaga
- Infraorder: Scarabaeiformia
- Family: Scarabaeidae
- Genus: Heteronyx
- Species: H. praecox

Binomial name
- Heteronyx praecox (Erichson, 1842)

Synonyms
- Silopa praecox Erichson, 1842; Heteronyx testaceus Blackburn, 1888

Species of beetle

Heteronyx praecox is a species of beetle of the family Scarabaeidae. It is found in Australia (Tasmania, South Australia, Australian Capital Territory).

== Description ==
Adults reach a length of about 6–8 mm (0.24–0.31 in). They are testaceous or castaneous.
