= Heteronyx pilosellus =

Scientific classification
- Kingdom: Animalia
- Phylum: Arthropoda
- Clade: Pancrustacea
- Class: Insecta
- Order: Coleoptera
- Suborder: Polyphaga
- Infraorder: Scarabaeiformia
- Family: Scarabaeidae
- Genus: Heteronyx
- Species: H. pilosellus

Binomial name
- Heteronyx pilosellus Blanchard, 1850

Synonyms
- Heteronyx copiosus Blackburn, 1909

Species of beetle

Heteronyx pilosellus is a species of beetle of the family Scarabaeidae. It is found in Australia (New South Wales, Australian Capital Territory, Victoria, Tasmania).

== Description ==
Adults reach a length of about 11–14 mm (0.43–0.55 in). They are uniformly dark brown, with the head, pronotum and elytra uniformly punctured.
