= Heteronyx rubescens =

Scientific classification
- Kingdom: Animalia
- Phylum: Arthropoda
- Clade: Pancrustacea
- Class: Insecta
- Order: Coleoptera
- Suborder: Polyphaga
- Infraorder: Scarabaeiformia
- Family: Scarabaeidae
- Genus: Heteronyx
- Species: H. rubescens

Binomial name
- Heteronyx rubescens Blanchard, 1850

Species of beetle

Heteronyx rubescens is a species of beetle of the family Scarabaeidae. It is found in Australia (Victoria, South Australia, Western Australia).

== Description ==
Adults reach a length of about 8–10 mm (0.31–0.39 in). They are dark reddish brown to piceous. The clypeus and frons have dense, short, pale setae and the apices of the elytra have broad, pale yellow margins.
