= Heteronyx beltanae =

Scientific classification
- Kingdom: Animalia
- Phylum: Arthropoda
- Clade: Pancrustacea
- Class: Insecta
- Order: Coleoptera
- Suborder: Polyphaga
- Infraorder: Scarabaeiformia
- Family: Scarabaeidae
- Genus: Heteronyx
- Species: H. beltanae

Binomial name
- Heteronyx beltanae Blackburn, 1888

Species of beetle

Heteronyx beltanae is a species of beetle of the family Scarabaeidae. It is found in Australia (South Australia, Western Australia).

== Description ==
Adults reach a length of about 6.5–8 mm (0.26–0.31 in). They are very similar to Heteronyx frenchi, but may be distinguished by the shorter semi-erect setae on the pronotum and elytra.
