= Heteronyx striatus =

Scientific classification
- Kingdom: Animalia
- Phylum: Arthropoda
- Clade: Pancrustacea
- Class: Insecta
- Order: Coleoptera
- Suborder: Polyphaga
- Infraorder: Scarabaeiformia
- Family: Scarabaeidae
- Genus: Heteronyx
- Species: H. striatus

Binomial name
- Heteronyx striatus Blackburn, 1909

Synonyms
- Heteronyx seriatus Blackburn, 1909

Species of beetle

Heteronyx striatus is a species of beetle of the family Scarabaeidae. It is found in Australia (New South Wales, Queensland).

== Description ==
Adults reach a length of about 9–12 mm (0.35–0.47 in). They are pale castaneous, with the pronotum and elytra shining and sparsely covered with long setae. The elytra have a number of impressed, longitudinal striae.
