= Heteronyx victoris =

Scientific classification
- Kingdom: Animalia
- Phylum: Arthropoda
- Clade: Pancrustacea
- Class: Insecta
- Order: Coleoptera
- Suborder: Polyphaga
- Infraorder: Scarabaeiformia
- Family: Scarabaeidae
- Genus: Heteronyx
- Species: H. victoris

Binomial name
- Heteronyx victoris Blackburn, 1888

Synonyms
- Heteronyx socius Blackburn, 1909

Species of beetle

Heteronyx victoris is a species of beetle of the family Scarabaeidae. It is found in Australia (South Australia, Western Australia).

== Description ==
Adults reach a length of about 9 mm (0.35 in). They are dark castaneous, with the dorsal surface and lower half of the pygidium shining. They are covered with short erect setae.
