= Heteronyx costulatus =

Scientific classification
- Kingdom: Animalia
- Phylum: Arthropoda
- Clade: Pancrustacea
- Class: Insecta
- Order: Coleoptera
- Suborder: Polyphaga
- Infraorder: Scarabaeiformia
- Family: Scarabaeidae
- Genus: Heteronyx
- Species: H. costulatus

Binomial name
- Heteronyx costulatus Blackburn, 1910

Species of beetle

Heteronyx costulatus is a species of beetle of the family Scarabaeidae. It is found in Australia (Western Australia).

== Description ==
Adults reach a length of about 5.5 mm (0.22 in). The clypeus, frons, pronotum and elytra are testaceous. There is a small, dark brown comma-shaped mark on each side of the base of the clypeus. The pronotum has a fringe of long setae along the anterior margin, while there are short setae on the disc of both the pronotum and elytra.
