= Heteronyx pustulosus =

Scientific classification
- Kingdom: Animalia
- Phylum: Arthropoda
- Clade: Pancrustacea
- Class: Insecta
- Order: Coleoptera
- Suborder: Polyphaga
- Infraorder: Scarabaeiformia
- Family: Scarabaeidae
- Genus: Heteronyx
- Species: H. pustulosus

Binomial name
- Heteronyx pustulosus Blackburn, 1890

Species of beetle

Heteronyx pustulosus is a species of beetle of the family Scarabaeidae. It is found in Australia (Victoria, New South Wales, South Australia).

== Description ==
Adults reach a length of about 12–16 mm (0.47–0.63 in). They are castaneous. The dorsal surface is densely covered with short setae and there is a fringe of long, erect setae on the anterior margin of the pronotum. Both the elytra and pygidium are covered with short setae, the former some long, erect, yellowish setae on the disc.
