= Heteronyx froggatti =

Scientific classification
- Kingdom: Animalia
- Phylum: Arthropoda
- Clade: Pancrustacea
- Class: Insecta
- Order: Coleoptera
- Suborder: Polyphaga
- Infraorder: Scarabaeiformia
- Family: Scarabaeidae
- Genus: Heteronyx
- Species: H. froggatti

Binomial name
- Heteronyx froggatti MacLeay, 1888

Species of beetle

Heteronyx froggatti is a species of beetle of the family Scarabaeidae. It is found in Australia (Western Australia).

== Description ==
Adults reach a length of about 8 mm (0.31 in). The elytra has coarse punctures, while the pygidium is sparsely punctured.
