= Heteronyx alienus =

Scientific classification
- Kingdom: Animalia
- Phylum: Arthropoda
- Clade: Pancrustacea
- Class: Insecta
- Order: Coleoptera
- Suborder: Polyphaga
- Infraorder: Scarabaeiformia
- Family: Scarabaeidae
- Genus: Heteronyx
- Species: H. alienus

Binomial name
- Heteronyx alienus Blackburn, 1892

Species of beetle

Heteronyx alienus is a species of beetle of the family Scarabaeidae. It is found in Australia (Western Australia).

== Description ==
Adults reach a length of about 5.5 mm (0.22 in). The clypeus, frons, pronotum and elytra are very coarsely and sparsely punctured.
