= Heteronyx ruficollis =

Scientific classification
- Kingdom: Animalia
- Phylum: Arthropoda
- Clade: Pancrustacea
- Class: Insecta
- Order: Coleoptera
- Suborder: Polyphaga
- Infraorder: Scarabaeiformia
- Family: Scarabaeidae
- Genus: Heteronyx
- Species: H. ruficollis

Binomial name
- Heteronyx ruficollis MacLeay, 1871

Species of beetle

Heteronyx ruficollis is a species of beetle of the family Scarabaeidae. It is found in Australia (Queensland).

== Description ==
Adults reach a length of about 6 mm (0.24 in). The head, pronotum, pygidium, legs and ventral surface are pale yellowish brown, while the scutellum and elytra are dark brown. The clypeus is coarsely punctured and has a row of short setae and some larger ones. The pronotum and elytra are covered with short setae and some long ones on the disc.
