= Heteronyx minutus =

Scientific classification
- Kingdom: Animalia
- Phylum: Arthropoda
- Clade: Pancrustacea
- Class: Insecta
- Order: Coleoptera
- Suborder: Polyphaga
- Infraorder: Scarabaeiformia
- Family: Scarabaeidae
- Genus: Heteronyx
- Species: H. minutus

Binomial name
- Heteronyx minutus Blackburn, 1910

Species of beetle

Heteronyx minutus is a species of beetle of the family Scarabaeidae. It is found in Australia (South Australia).

== Description ==
Adults reach a length of about 3.5 mm (0.14 in). The frons and the disc of the pronotum are dark yellowish brown, while the clypeus, sides of the pronotum and elytra are paler. The pygidium is sparsely punctured and the elytra are dull with longitudinal striae.
