= Heteronyx simulator =

Scientific classification
- Kingdom: Animalia
- Phylum: Arthropoda
- Clade: Pancrustacea
- Class: Insecta
- Order: Coleoptera
- Suborder: Polyphaga
- Infraorder: Scarabaeiformia
- Family: Scarabaeidae
- Genus: Heteronyx
- Species: H. simulator

Binomial name
- Heteronyx simulator Blackburn, 1888

Synonyms
- Heteronyx thoracicus Blackburn, 1909

Species of beetle

Heteronyx simulator is a species of beetle of the family Scarabaeidae. It is found in Australia (South Australia, New South Wales, Victoria).

== Description ==
Adults reach a length of about 7–8.5 mm (0.28–0.33 in). They are shining black.
