= Heteronyx parvulus =

Scientific classification
- Kingdom: Animalia
- Phylum: Arthropoda
- Clade: Pancrustacea
- Class: Insecta
- Order: Coleoptera
- Suborder: Polyphaga
- Infraorder: Scarabaeiformia
- Family: Scarabaeidae
- Genus: Heteronyx
- Species: H. parvulus

Binomial name
- Heteronyx parvulus MacLeay, 1888

Species of beetle

Heteronyx parvulus is a species of beetle of the family Scarabaeidae. It is found in Australia (Western Australia, Northern Territory).

== Description ==
Adults reach a length of about 5.3–5.75 mm (0.209–0.226 in). They are pale castaneous. The clypeus and frons are coarsely punctured and the pronotum and elytra are uniformly punctured. Females have some long stout spines on the elytral apices.
