= Heteronyx aphodioides =

Scientific classification
- Kingdom: Animalia
- Phylum: Arthropoda
- Clade: Pancrustacea
- Class: Insecta
- Order: Coleoptera
- Suborder: Polyphaga
- Infraorder: Scarabaeiformia
- Family: Scarabaeidae
- Genus: Heteronyx
- Species: H. aphodioides

Binomial name
- Heteronyx aphodioides Blanchard, 1850

Synonyms
- Heteronyx incultus Blackburn, 1889; Heteronyx potens Blackburn, 1889

Species of beetle

Heteronyx aphodioides is a species of beetle of the family Scarabaeidae. It is found in Australia (New South Wales, Victoria, South Australia, Australian Capital Territory, Tasmania).

== Description ==
Adults reach a length of about 5–8 mm (0.20–0.31 in). They are black, with a black antennal club and strong, microsculpture on the upper surface and pygidium, which is most obvious on the dull pronotum.
