= Heteronyx tasmanicus =

Scientific classification
- Kingdom: Animalia
- Phylum: Arthropoda
- Clade: Pancrustacea
- Class: Insecta
- Order: Coleoptera
- Suborder: Polyphaga
- Infraorder: Scarabaeiformia
- Family: Scarabaeidae
- Genus: Heteronyx
- Species: H. tasmanicus

Binomial name
- Heteronyx tasmanicus Blackburn, 1909

Synonyms
- Heteronyx quaesitus Blackburn, 1909

Species of beetle

Heteronyx tasmanicus is a species of beetle of the family Scarabaeidae. It is found in Australia (Tasmania, Victoria, New South Wales).

== Description ==
Adults reach a length of about 9–14 mm (0.35–0.55 in). They are dark castaneous, with the dorsal surface covered with long setae. The upper half of the pygidium is dull, while the remainder is shining.
