= Heteronyx placidus =

Scientific classification
- Kingdom: Animalia
- Phylum: Arthropoda
- Clade: Pancrustacea
- Class: Insecta
- Order: Coleoptera
- Suborder: Polyphaga
- Infraorder: Scarabaeiformia
- Family: Scarabaeidae
- Genus: Heteronyx
- Species: H. placidus

Binomial name
- Heteronyx placidus Blackburn, 1910

Species of beetle

Heteronyx placidus is a species of beetle of the family Scarabaeidae. It is found in Australia (Western Australia, Northern Territory).

== Description ==
Adults reach a length of about 9–10 mm (0.35–0.39 in). They are castaneous. Most setae on the elytra are semi-erect, but there are also some erect ones on the sutural interval and the apical declivity.
