= Heteronyx doddi =

Scientific classification
- Kingdom: Animalia
- Phylum: Arthropoda
- Clade: Pancrustacea
- Class: Insecta
- Order: Coleoptera
- Suborder: Polyphaga
- Infraorder: Scarabaeiformia
- Family: Scarabaeidae
- Genus: Heteronyx
- Species: H. doddi

Binomial name
- Heteronyx doddi Blackburn, 1908

Species of beetle

Heteronyx doddi is a species of beetle of the family Scarabaeidae. It is found in Australia (Queensland).

== Description ==
Adults reach a length of about 7–8 mm (0.28–0.31 in). They are pale reddish brown. The elytra are covered with semi-erect setae, mixed with a few erect ones near the base. The pygidium also has some long setae and short semi-erect ones.
