= Heteronyx humilis =

Scientific classification
- Kingdom: Animalia
- Phylum: Arthropoda
- Clade: Pancrustacea
- Class: Insecta
- Order: Coleoptera
- Suborder: Polyphaga
- Infraorder: Scarabaeiformia
- Family: Scarabaeidae
- Genus: Heteronyx
- Species: H. humilis

Binomial name
- Heteronyx humilis Blackburn, 1888

Species of beetle

Heteronyx humilis is a species of beetle of the family Scarabaeidae. It is found in Australia (New South Wales).

== Description ==
Adults reach a length of about 7 mm (0.28 in). They are pale castaneous, with a shining dorsal surface.
