= Heteronyx montanus =

Scientific classification
- Kingdom: Animalia
- Phylum: Arthropoda
- Clade: Pancrustacea
- Class: Insecta
- Order: Coleoptera
- Suborder: Polyphaga
- Infraorder: Scarabaeiformia
- Family: Scarabaeidae
- Genus: Heteronyx
- Species: H. montanus

Binomial name
- Heteronyx montanus Blackburn, 1890

Synonyms
- Heteronyx miser Blackburn, 1910; Heteronyx ordinarius Blackburn, 1910

Species of beetle

Heteronyx montanus is a species of beetle of the family Scarabaeidae. It is found in Australia (New South Wales, Victoria, Tasmania).

== Description ==
Adults reach a length of about 7–8 mm (0.28–0.31 in). They are pale castaneous. The pygidium is covered with long, semi-erect setae, while the propygidium has a row of dense, fine punctures.
