= Heteronyx lividus =

Scientific classification
- Kingdom: Animalia
- Phylum: Arthropoda
- Clade: Pancrustacea
- Class: Insecta
- Order: Coleoptera
- Suborder: Polyphaga
- Infraorder: Scarabaeiformia
- Family: Scarabaeidae
- Genus: Heteronyx
- Species: H. lividus

Binomial name
- Heteronyx lividus Blackburn, 1889

Species of beetle

Heteronyx lividus is a species of beetle of the family Scarabaeidae. It is found in Australia (Northern Territory, Western Australia).

== Description ==
Adults reach a length of about 4–5 mm (0.16–0.20 in). They are pale yellowish brown.
