= Heteronyx insignis =

Scientific classification
- Kingdom: Animalia
- Phylum: Arthropoda
- Clade: Pancrustacea
- Class: Insecta
- Order: Coleoptera
- Suborder: Polyphaga
- Infraorder: Scarabaeiformia
- Family: Scarabaeidae
- Genus: Heteronyx
- Species: H. insignis

Binomial name
- Heteronyx insignis Blackburn, 1888

Species of beetle

Heteronyx insignis is a species of beetle of the family Scarabaeidae. It is found in Australia (South Australia, Victoria).

== Description ==
Adults reach a length of about 11–13 mm (0.43–0.51 in). They are castaneous, the dorsal surface with a grape-like bloom. There are some long, pale brown setae on the disc of the pronotum and elytra, as well as a dense clothing of short, pale setae.
