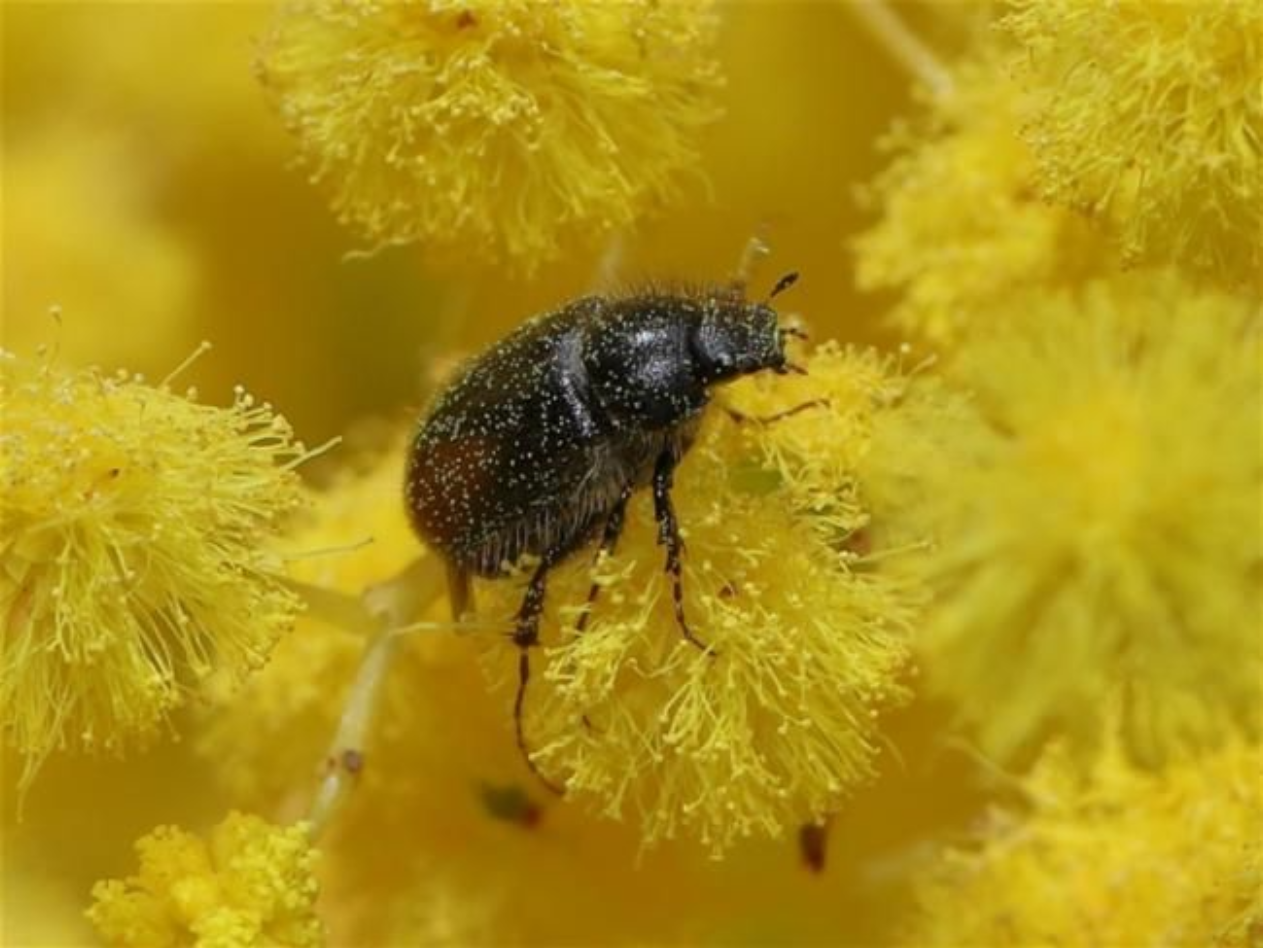

Scientific classification
- Kingdom: Animalia
- Phylum: Arthropoda
- Clade: Pancrustacea
- Class: Insecta
- Order: Coleoptera
- Suborder: Polyphaga
- Infraorder: Scarabaeiformia
- Family: Scarabaeidae
- Genus: Heteronyx
- Species: H. dimidiatus

Binomial name
- Heteronyx dimidiatus (Erichson, 1842)

Synonyms
- Silopa dimidiata Erichson, 1842; Heteronyx fallax Blackburn, 1890; Heteronyx fraternus Blackburn, 1890; Heteronyx jubatus Blackburn, 1890; Heteronyx striatipennis Blanchard, 1850; Cotidia australis Boisduval, 1835

= Heteronyx dimidiatus =

Species of beetle

Heteronyx dimidiatus is a species of beetle of the family Scarabaeidae. It is found in Australia (Tasmania, New South Wales, South Australia, Australian Capital Territory).

== Description ==
Adults reach a length of about 5–7 mm (0.20–0.28 in). The head, antennae, pronotum, scutellum, base of the elytra and ventral surface are black or fuscous, while the remainder of the elytra is pale castaneous. The clypeus, frons, pronotum and base of the elytra have long, brown setae and the whole dorsal surface is also clothed with short, pale setae.
