= Heteronyx doctus =

Scientific classification
- Kingdom: Animalia
- Phylum: Arthropoda
- Clade: Pancrustacea
- Class: Insecta
- Order: Coleoptera
- Suborder: Polyphaga
- Infraorder: Scarabaeiformia
- Family: Scarabaeidae
- Genus: Heteronyx
- Species: H. doctus

Binomial name
- Heteronyx doctus Blackburn, 1890

Species of beetle

Heteronyx doctus is a species of beetle of the family Scarabaeidae. It is found in Australia (South Australia).

== Description ==
Adults reach a length of about 6.5–7 mm (0.26–0.28 in). They are yellowish brown, with fine and dense punctures on the pronotum and elytra, as well as pale setae.
