= Heteronyx pygidialis =

Scientific classification
- Kingdom: Animalia
- Phylum: Arthropoda
- Clade: Pancrustacea
- Class: Insecta
- Order: Coleoptera
- Suborder: Polyphaga
- Infraorder: Scarabaeiformia
- Family: Scarabaeidae
- Genus: Heteronyx
- Species: H. pygidialis

Binomial name
- Heteronyx pygidialis Blackburn, 1888

Species of beetle

Heteronyx pygidialis is a species of beetle of the family Scarabaeidae. It is found in Australia (Victoria, South Australia).

== Description ==
Adults reach a length of about 5.5–7.5 mm (0.22–0.30 in). They are pale castaneous, with long setae on the disc of the head, pronotum and elytra. The head and elytra are shining, while the pronotum is dull.
