= Heteronyx nigrita =

Scientific classification
- Kingdom: Animalia
- Phylum: Arthropoda
- Clade: Pancrustacea
- Class: Insecta
- Order: Coleoptera
- Suborder: Polyphaga
- Infraorder: Scarabaeiformia
- Family: Scarabaeidae
- Genus: Heteronyx
- Species: H. nigrita

Binomial name
- Heteronyx nigrita Blanchard, 1850

Synonyms
- Heteronyx mildurensis Blackburn, 1910; Heteronyx nigrinus Blackburn, 1890; Heteronyx vacuus Blackburn, 1890

Species of beetle

Heteronyx nigrita is a species of beetle of the family Scarabaeidae. It is found in Australia (Victoria, New South Wales, South Australia).

== Description ==
Adults reach a length of about 6–7 mm (0.24–0.28 in). They are shining black or castaneous, the pronotum with a narrow shining, area without punctures along the posterior margin. The elytra are shining on the disc but dull close to the apices. The basal half of the pygidium is dull with some short setae.
