= Heteronyx sequens =

Scientific classification
- Kingdom: Animalia
- Phylum: Arthropoda
- Clade: Pancrustacea
- Class: Insecta
- Order: Coleoptera
- Suborder: Polyphaga
- Infraorder: Scarabaeiformia
- Family: Scarabaeidae
- Genus: Heteronyx
- Species: H. sequens

Binomial name
- Heteronyx sequens Blackburn, 1894

Synonyms
- Heteronyx ignobilis Blackburn, 1910; Heteronyx sollicitus Blackburn, 1910

Species of beetle

Heteronyx sequens is a species of beetle of the family Scarabaeidae. It is found in Australia (Queensland).

== Description ==
Adults reach a length of about 7–9 mm (0.28–0.35 in).
