= Heteronyx laeviceps =

Scientific classification
- Kingdom: Animalia
- Phylum: Arthropoda
- Clade: Pancrustacea
- Class: Insecta
- Order: Coleoptera
- Suborder: Polyphaga
- Infraorder: Scarabaeiformia
- Family: Scarabaeidae
- Genus: Heteronyx
- Species: H. laeviceps

Binomial name
- Heteronyx laeviceps Blackburn, 1888

Species of beetle

Heteronyx laeviceps is a species of beetle of the family Scarabaeidae. It is found in Australia (South Australia, Victoria).

== Description ==
Adults reach a length of about 6–8 mm (0.24–0.31 in). The dorsal surface is piceous or black, while the ventral surface is dark brown, the legs reddish brown and the antennae yellowish brown. Both the head and pronotum are dull, while the elytra are shining and punctured.
