= Heteronyx acutifrons =

Scientific classification
- Kingdom: Animalia
- Phylum: Arthropoda
- Clade: Pancrustacea
- Class: Insecta
- Order: Coleoptera
- Suborder: Polyphaga
- Infraorder: Scarabaeiformia
- Family: Scarabaeidae
- Genus: Heteronyx
- Species: H. acutifrons

Binomial name
- Heteronyx acutifrons Blackburn, 1889

Species of beetle

Heteronyx acutifrons is a species of beetle of the family Scarabaeidae. It is found in Australia (South Australia, Western Australia, Northern Territory).

== Description ==
Adults reach a length of about 6–9 mm (0.24–0.35 in). They are pale yellowish brown, the pronotum with a small dark brown or black spot near the middle of each half of the disc. The pronotum also has a fringe of long yellowish setae on the anterior margin and the disc of the elytra is sparsely covered with short, yellowish setae, while there are long setae on the pygidium.
