= Heteronyx nigricans =

Scientific classification
- Kingdom: Animalia
- Phylum: Arthropoda
- Clade: Pancrustacea
- Class: Insecta
- Order: Coleoptera
- Suborder: Polyphaga
- Infraorder: Scarabaeiformia
- Family: Scarabaeidae
- Genus: Heteronyx
- Species: H. nigricans

Binomial name
- Heteronyx nigricans Burmeister, 1855

Synonyms
- Heteronyx comes Blackburn, 1910

Species of beetle

Heteronyx nigricans is a species of beetle of the family Scarabaeidae. It is found in Australia (Western Australia).

== Description ==
Adults reach a length of about 8–9 mm (0.31–0.35 in). The head and pronotum are black, the elytra piceous and the club of the antennae is also black.
