= Heteronyx dentipes =

Scientific classification
- Kingdom: Animalia
- Phylum: Arthropoda
- Clade: Pancrustacea
- Class: Insecta
- Order: Coleoptera
- Suborder: Polyphaga
- Infraorder: Scarabaeiformia
- Family: Scarabaeidae
- Genus: Heteronyx
- Species: H. dentipes

Binomial name
- Heteronyx dentipes Blackburn, 1889

Species of beetle

Heteronyx dentipes is a species of beetle of the family Scarabaeidae. It is found in Australia (South Australia, Victoria).

== Description ==
Adults reach a length of about 8 mm (0.31 in). They have a castaneous body. The pronotum is without setae, faintly punctured in the middle and more strongly punctured at the sides. The elytra only have a few tiny setae, while the propygidium has tiny whitish scales.
