= Heteronyx hirsutus =

Scientific classification
- Kingdom: Animalia
- Phylum: Arthropoda
- Clade: Pancrustacea
- Class: Insecta
- Order: Coleoptera
- Suborder: Polyphaga
- Infraorder: Scarabaeiformia
- Family: Scarabaeidae
- Genus: Heteronyx
- Species: H. hirsutus

Binomial name
- Heteronyx hirsutus Blackburn, 1910

Species of beetle

Heteronyx hirsutus is a species of beetle of the family Scarabaeidae. It is found in Australia (Western Australia).

== Description ==
Adults reach a length of about 8–9 mm (0.31–0.35 in). They are pale castaneous, with the surface of the pronotum dull.
