= Heteronyx rotundiceps =

Scientific classification
- Kingdom: Animalia
- Phylum: Arthropoda
- Clade: Pancrustacea
- Class: Insecta
- Order: Coleoptera
- Suborder: Polyphaga
- Infraorder: Scarabaeiformia
- Family: Scarabaeidae
- Genus: Heteronyx
- Species: H. rotundiceps

Binomial name
- Heteronyx rotundiceps Blanchard, 1850

Synonyms
- Heteronyx debilis Blackburn, 1889

Species of beetle

Heteronyx rotundiceps is a species of beetle of the family Scarabaeidae. It is found in Australia (South Australia).

== Description ==
Adults reach a length of about 8–9 mm (0.31–0.35 in). They are dark castaneous, with the clypeus and frons densely punctured.
