= Heteronyx aridus =

Scientific classification
- Kingdom: Animalia
- Phylum: Arthropoda
- Clade: Pancrustacea
- Class: Insecta
- Order: Coleoptera
- Suborder: Polyphaga
- Infraorder: Scarabaeiformia
- Family: Scarabaeidae
- Genus: Heteronyx
- Species: H. aridus

Binomial name
- Heteronyx aridus Blackburn, 1889

Species of beetle

Heteronyx aridus is a species of beetle of the family Scarabaeidae. It is found in Australia (South Australia).

== Description ==
Adults reach a length of about 3.5–5 mm (0.14–0.20 in). They have a very dark reddish brown body, with the lateral margins of the clypeus pale reddish. The pronotum has an anterior fringe consisting of long, pale setae and the surface of both the pronotum and elytra is dull.
