= Heteronyx fulvohirtus =

Scientific classification
- Kingdom: Animalia
- Phylum: Arthropoda
- Clade: Pancrustacea
- Class: Insecta
- Order: Coleoptera
- Suborder: Polyphaga
- Infraorder: Scarabaeiformia
- Family: Scarabaeidae
- Genus: Heteronyx
- Species: H. fulvohirtus

Binomial name
- Heteronyx fulvohirtus Blackburn, 1888

Synonyms
- Heteronyx dispar Blackburn, 1908; Heteronyx litigiosus Blackburn, 1908; Heteronyx rudis Blackburn, 1908

Species of beetle

Heteronyx fulvohirtus is a species of beetle of the family Scarabaeidae. It is found in Australia (South Australia, Western Australia).

== Description ==
Adults reach a length of about 9–10 mm (0.35–0.39 in). They are castaneous. The pygidium is covered with short semi-erect setae mixed with a few long ones. The setae on the disc of the elytra are long.
