= Heteronyx pellucidus =

Scientific classification
- Kingdom: Animalia
- Phylum: Arthropoda
- Clade: Pancrustacea
- Class: Insecta
- Order: Coleoptera
- Suborder: Polyphaga
- Infraorder: Scarabaeiformia
- Family: Scarabaeidae
- Genus: Heteronyx
- Species: H. pellucidus

Binomial name
- Heteronyx pellucidus Burmeister, 1855

Synonyms
- Heteronyx distortus Lea, 1926; Heteronyx scutatus MacLeay, 1888

Species of beetle

Heteronyx pellucidus is a species of beetle of the family Scarabaeidae. It is found in Australia (Tasmania, Northern Territory, South Australia, Western Australia, Queensland).

== Description ==
Adults reach a length of about 6–9 mm (0.24–0.35 in). The body is testaceous. The males have very unequal anterior claws, with the outer one being stronger and strongly curved, while the inner claw is normal.
