= Heteronyx orbus =

Scientific classification
- Kingdom: Animalia
- Phylum: Arthropoda
- Clade: Pancrustacea
- Class: Insecta
- Order: Coleoptera
- Suborder: Polyphaga
- Infraorder: Scarabaeiformia
- Family: Scarabaeidae
- Genus: Heteronyx
- Species: H. orbus

Binomial name
- Heteronyx orbus Blackburn, 1909

Species of beetle

Heteronyx orbus is a species of beetle of the family Scarabaeidae. It is found in Australia (New South Wales).

== Description ==
Adults reach a length of about 9 mm (0.35 in). They are dark castaneous. The areas within the elytral apices are dull and bear conical, pointed brown spines. Similar spines are found on the pygidium.
