= Heteronyx mundus =

Scientific classification
- Kingdom: Animalia
- Phylum: Arthropoda
- Clade: Pancrustacea
- Class: Insecta
- Order: Coleoptera
- Suborder: Polyphaga
- Infraorder: Scarabaeiformia
- Family: Scarabaeidae
- Genus: Heteronyx
- Species: H. mundus

Binomial name
- Heteronyx mundus Blackburn, 1909

Species of beetle

Heteronyx mundus is a species of beetle of the family Scarabaeidae. It is found in Australia (Western Australia).

== Description ==
Adults reach a length of about 9 mm (0.35 in). They are castaneous, with the head coarsely and densely punctured. The pronotum and elytra are shining, except the dull apices of the latter. There are short setae on the disc of the elytra.
