= Heteronyx major =

Scientific classification
- Kingdom: Animalia
- Phylum: Arthropoda
- Clade: Pancrustacea
- Class: Insecta
- Order: Coleoptera
- Suborder: Polyphaga
- Infraorder: Scarabaeiformia
- Family: Scarabaeidae
- Genus: Heteronyx
- Species: H. major

Binomial name
- Heteronyx major Blackburn, 1910

Synonyms
- Heteronyx moestus Blackburn, 1910

Species of beetle

Heteronyx major is a species of beetle of the family Scarabaeidae. It is found in Australia (New South Wales, Victoria, Australian Capital Territory).

== Description ==
Adults reach a length of about 12–17 mm (0.47–0.67 in). They are dark castaneous and densely covered with short, pale setae. The pronotum also has a fringe of setae and some scattered long brown setae on the disc.
