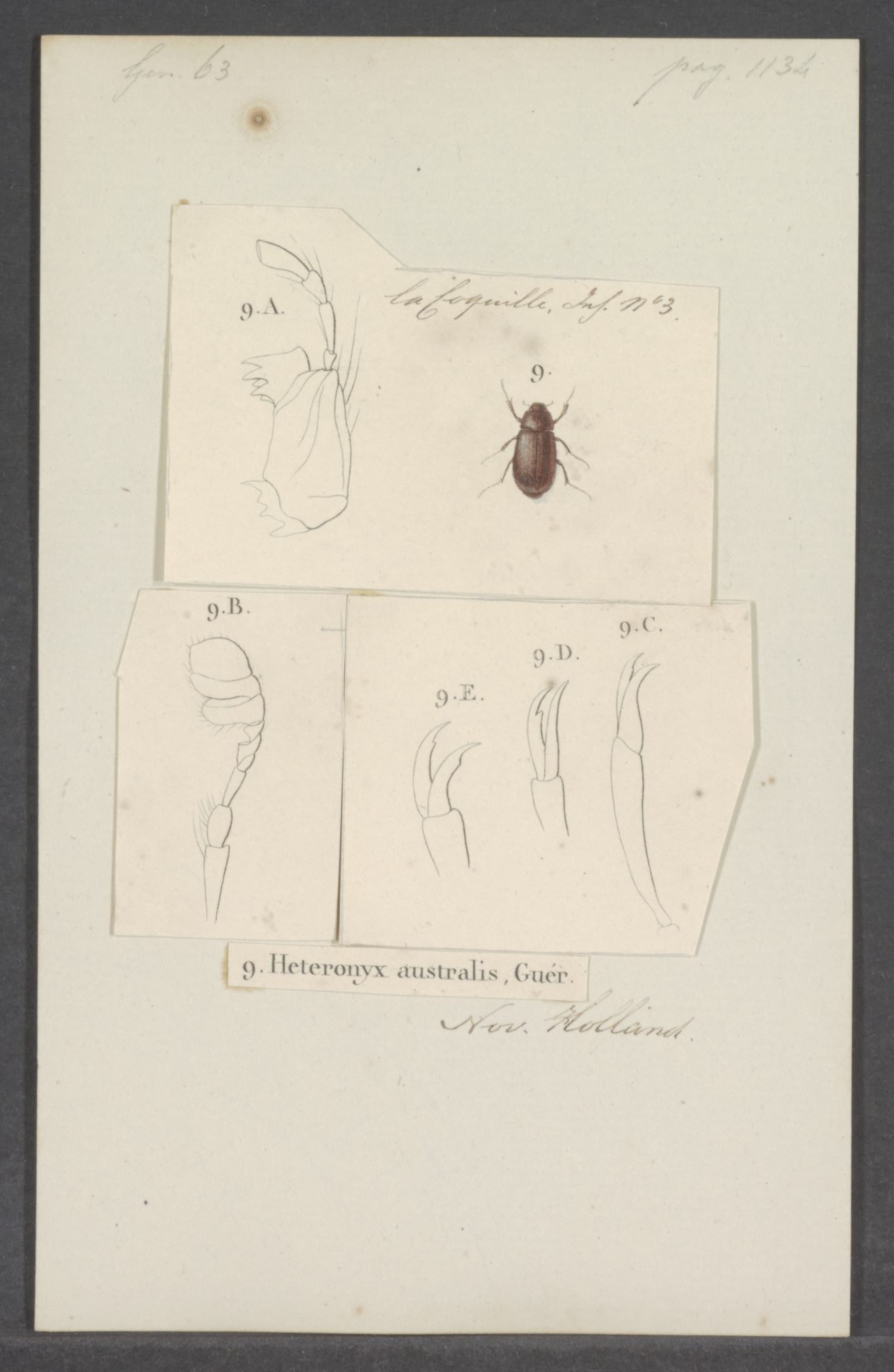

Scientific classification
- Kingdom: Animalia
- Phylum: Arthropoda
- Clade: Pancrustacea
- Class: Insecta
- Order: Coleoptera
- Suborder: Polyphaga
- Infraorder: Scarabaeiformia
- Family: Scarabaeidae
- Tribe: Heteronychini
- Genus: Heteronyx; Guérin-Méneville, 1831

Synonyms
- Anacheirotus Blackburn, 1900; Hostilina Blanchard, 1850; Silopa Erichson, 1842; Cotidia Kirby, 1835

= Heteronyx =

Genus of beetles

Heteronyx is a genus of beetles in the family Melolonthidae found in Australia and Melanesia.

== Taxonomic history ==
The genus has been challenging for scientists, because many species are very similar in appearance. Thomas Blackburn described most of the Australian species, using the key he devised to separate the species. Arthur Mills Lea spend years working on a revision of the genus, but eventually gave up. It was not until 2000 that E. B. Britton published a revision of the genus, in which he synonomised 111 of the total of 353 described Australian species. Britton states that the aim of his revision was to establish synonymies and to make identifiable the valid species so far described. This would make a future full revision of the genus possible and would also make it possible to describe the numerous species that are yet undescribed.

== Species ==
- Heteronyx acutifrons Blackburn, 1889
- Heteronyx additus Blackburn, 1909
- Heteronyx advena Blackburn, 1890
- Heteronyx aequaliceps Blackburn, 1890
- Heteronyx aequalis Blackburn, 1888
- Heteronyx affinis Blackburn, 1909
- Heteronyx agrestis Burmeister, 1855
- Heteronyx agricola Blackburn, 1910
- Heteronyx alienus Blackburn, 1892
- Heteronyx alpicola Blackburn, 1892
- Heteronyx ambiguus Blackburn, 1910
- Heteronyx amboinensis Moser, 1920
- Heteronyx apertus Blackburn, 1910
- Heteronyx aphodioides Blanchard, 1850
- Heteronyx apicispinosa Heller, 1914
- Heteronyx arcanus Blackburn, 1892
- Heteronyx aridus Blackburn, 1889
- Heteronyx aruanus Moser, 1920
- Heteronyx asperatus Moser, 1920
- Heteronyx aspericollis Blackburn, 1889
- Heteronyx asperifrons Blackburn, 1909
- Heteronyx augustae Blackburn, 1889
- Heteronyx australis Guérin-Méneville, 1831
- Heteronyx badius MacLeay, 1888
- Heteronyx beltanae Blackburn, 1888
- Heteronyx bidentatus Blackburn, 1889
- Heteronyx blandus Blackburn, 1909
- Heteronyx borealis Blackburn, 1889
- Heteronyx bovilli Blackburn, 1890
- Heteronyx brevior Fairmaire, 1883
- Heteronyx caledoniae Fauvel, 1903
- Heteronyx calidus Blackburn, 1910
- Heteronyx callabonnae Blackburn, 1909
- Heteronyx capillatus MacLeay, 1888
- Heteronyx castanescens Moser, 1924
- Heteronyx castaneus Blanchard, 1850
- Heteronyx cervina (Boisduval, 1835)
- Heteronyx chlorotica (Gyllenhal, 1817)
- Heteronyx cliens Blackburn, 1910
- Heteronyx collaris Blackburn, 1890
- Heteronyx colossus Arrow, 1915
- Heteronyx comans Blackburn, 1909
- Heteronyx concolor MacLeay, 1871
- Heteronyx confertus Blackburn, 1910
- Heteronyx constans Blackburn, 1889
- Heteronyx corpulentus MacLeay, 1888
- Heteronyx costulatus Blackburn, 1910
- Heteronyx crassus Blackburn, 1889
- Heteronyx cribriceps Blackburn, 1892
- Heteronyx crinitus Blackburn, 1910
- Heteronyx cunnamullae Blackburn, 1910
- Heteronyx cygneus Blackburn, 1889
- Heteronyx darlingensis Blackburn, 1888
- Heteronyx declaratus Blackburn, 1909
- Heteronyx dentipes Blackburn, 1889
- Heteronyx dimidiatus (Erichson, 1842)
- Heteronyx disjectus Blackburn, 1910
- Heteronyx diversiceps Blackburn, 1890
- Heteronyx doctus Blackburn, 1890
- Heteronyx doddi Blackburn, 1908
- Heteronyx electus Blackburn, 1889
- Heteronyx elongatus Blanchard, 1850
- Heteronyx elytrurus Blackburn, 1909
- Heteronyx excisa Heller, 1912
- Heteronyx excisus Blackburn, 1890
- Heteronyx exectus Blackburn, 1909
- Heteronyx fervidus Blackburn, 1892
- Heteronyx fimbriatus Moser, 1924
- Heteronyx flavus Blackburn, 1890
- Heteronyx fortis Blackburn, 1888
- Heteronyx fraserensis Blackburn, 1892
- Heteronyx frenchi Blackburn, 1909
- Heteronyx froggatti MacLeay, 1888
- Heteronyx frontalis Blackburn, 1888
- Heteronyx fulvohirtus Blackburn, 1888
- Heteronyx fumata (Erichson, 1842)
- Heteronyx furvus Blackburn, 1892
- Heteronyx glabratus (Erichson, 1842)
- Heteronyx grandis Blackburn, 1900
- Heteronyx granulatus Blackburn, 1910
- Heteronyx granulifer Blackburn, 1889
- Heteronyx granum Burmeister, 1855
- Heteronyx helmsi Blackburn, 1892
- Heteronyx hirsutosetosus Moser, 1920
- Heteronyx hirsutus Blackburn, 1910
- Heteronyx hirtuosus Blackburn, 1890
- Heteronyx hispidulus Blackburn, 1908
- Heteronyx horridus Blackburn, 1888
- Heteronyx humilis Blackburn, 1910
- Heteronyx imitator Blackburn, 1909
- Heteronyx impar Blackburn, 1910
- Heteronyx incognitus Blackburn, 1892
- Heteronyx incola Blackburn, 1889
- Heteronyx infirmus Blackburn, 1910
- Heteronyx infuscatus MacLeay, 1871
- Heteronyx inornatus (Blackburn, 1900)
- Heteronyx insignis Blackburn, 1888
- Heteronyx insularis Fairmaire, 1883
- Heteronyx interioris Blackburn, 1909
- Heteronyx intrusus Blackburn, 1910
- Heteronyx iridiventris Blackburn, 1890
- Heteronyx irrasus Lea, 1926
- Heteronyx jejunus Blackburn, 1888
- Heteronyx johannis Blackburn, 1912
- Heteronyx labratus Moser, 1926
- Heteronyx laeviceps Blackburn, 1888
- Heteronyx laminatus Blackburn, 1890
- Heteronyx lateritius Blackburn, 1889
- Heteronyx laticeps Burmeister, 1855
- Heteronyx lilliputanus Blackburn, 1890
- Heteronyx lindi Blackburn, 1888
- Heteronyx lividus Blackburn, 1889
- Heteronyx lobatus Blackburn, 1888
- Heteronyx luteolus Blackburn, 1909
- Heteronyx maculatus Blackburn, 1888
- Heteronyx magnus Moser, 1924
- Heteronyx major Blackburn, 1910
- Heteronyx maluensis Brenske, 1889
- Heteronyx marcidus Blackburn, 1892
- Heteronyx marginatus Blackburn, 1890
- Heteronyx merus Blackburn, 1892
- Heteronyx metropolitanus Blackburn, 1909
- Heteronyx mimus Blackburn, 1890
- Heteronyx minimus Lea, 1926
- Heteronyx minutus Blackburn, 1910
- Heteronyx moluccanus Moser, 1920
- Heteronyx montanus Blackburn, 1890
- Heteronyx mulwalensis Blackburn, 1889
- Heteronyx mundus Blackburn, 1909
- Heteronyx nasutus Blackburn, 1889
- Heteronyx neglectus Blackburn, 1910
- Heteronyx nigellus (Erichson, 1842)
- Heteronyx nigrescens Blackburn, 1909
- Heteronyx nigricans Burmeister, 1855
- Heteronyx nigrita Blanchard, 1850
- Heteronyx nigritulus Moser, 1926
- Heteronyx normalis Blackburn, 1889
- Heteronyx novitius Blackburn, 1910
- Heteronyx obesa Burmeister, 1855
- Heteronyx oblongus Blanchard, 1850
- Heteronyx orbus Blackburn, 1909
- Heteronyx ovatus Blanchard, 1850
- Heteronyx pallidulus MacLeay, 1871
- Heteronyx paniei Paulian, 1991
- Heteronyx papuanus Moser, 1920
- Heteronyx parvulus MacLeay, 1888
- Heteronyx pauxillus Blackburn, 1910
- Heteronyx pellucidus Burmeister, 1855
- Heteronyx peregrinus Blackburn, 1890
- Heteronyx perkinsi Blackburn, 1909
- Heteronyx piceoniger MacLeay, 1888
- Heteronyx piceus Blanchard, 1850
- Heteronyx pilosellus Blanchard, 1850
- Heteronyx pilosus Blanchard, 1850
- Heteronyx placidus Blackburn, 1910
- Heteronyx planiceps Blackburn, 1910
- Heteronyx posticalis Blackburn, 1890
- Heteronyx praecox (Erichson, 1842)
- Heteronyx proditor Blackburn, 1892
- Heteronyx proprius Blackburn, 1910
- Heteronyx prosper Blackburn, 1909
- Heteronyx protervus Blackburn, 1892
- Heteronyx proxima Burmeister, 1855
- Heteronyx pubescens (Erichson, 1842)
- Heteronyx pumilus Sharp, 1877
- Heteronyx puncticollis Blackburn, 1890
- Heteronyx punctipennis Blackburn, 1889
- Heteronyx pustulosus Blackburn, 1890
- Heteronyx pygidialis Blackburn, 1888
- Heteronyx pygmaeus Blackburn, 1910
- Heteronyx quadraticollis Blackburn, 1890
- Heteronyx queenslandicus Blackburn, 1909
- Heteronyx randalli Blackburn, 1890
- Heteronyx rectangulus Blackburn, 1910
- Heteronyx relictus Blackburn, 1909
- Heteronyx rhinastus Blackburn, 1890
- Heteronyx rhinoceros Blackburn, 1892
- Heteronyx rothei Blackburn, 1890
- Heteronyx rotundiceps Blanchard, 1850
- Heteronyx rubescens Blanchard, 1850
- Heteronyx ruficollis MacLeay, 1871
- Heteronyx rufomarginatus Blanchard, 1850
- Heteronyx rufopiceus MacLeay, 1888
- Heteronyx rugosipennis MacLeay, 1871
- Heteronyx rusticus Blackburn, 1890
- Heteronyx salebrosus Blackburn, 1909
- Heteronyx satelles Blackburn, 1888
- Heteronyx scalptus Blackburn, 1890
- Heteronyx sequens Blackburn, 1894
- Heteronyx setifer Blackburn, 1890
- Heteronyx sexualis Blackburn, 1909
- Heteronyx siccus Blackburn, 1892
- Heteronyx simius Blackburn, 1890
- Heteronyx simplicicollis Blackburn, 1909
- Heteronyx simulator Blackburn, 1888
- Heteronyx sloanei Blackburn, 1889
- Heteronyx solidus Blackburn, 1888
- Heteronyx spadiceus Burmeister, 1855
- Heteronyx spretus Blackburn, 1888
- Heteronyx squalidus Blackburn, 1908
- Heteronyx striatus Blackburn, 1909
- Heteronyx suavis Blackburn, 1909
- Heteronyx subferruginea Burmeister, 1855
- Heteronyx subfuscus MacLeay, 1888
- Heteronyx subglaber MacLeay, 1888
- Heteronyx substriatus MacLeay, 1871
- Heteronyx sulcifrons Blackburn, 1909
- Heteronyx sydneyanus Blackburn, 1890
- Heteronyx tarsalis Blackburn, 1909
- Heteronyx tasmanicus Blackburn, 1909
- Heteronyx tenebrosus Blackburn, 1909
- Heteronyx tepperi Blackburn, 1888
- Heteronyx terrena Blackburn, 1892
- Heteronyx tindalei Britton, 1992
- Heteronyx torvus Blackburn, 1888
- Heteronyx transversicollis MacLeay, 1888
- Heteronyx tridentatus Lea, 1924
- Heteronyx tristis Blackburn, 1888
- Heteronyx umbilicatus Fauvel, 1903
- Heteronyx unicolor Blanchard, 1850
- Heteronyx unicus Blackburn, 1900
- Heteronyx variegatus Blackburn, 1888
- Heteronyx vicinus Blackburn, 1910
- Heteronyx victoris Blackburn, 1888
- Heteronyx viduus Blackburn, 1910
- Heteronyx zalotus Blackburn, 1910

== Species with unclear status ==
- Heteronyx planatus Burmeister, 1855 (described as Heteronyx planata from Western Australia)
