= Heteronyx sydneyanus =

Scientific classification
- Kingdom: Animalia
- Phylum: Arthropoda
- Clade: Pancrustacea
- Class: Insecta
- Order: Coleoptera
- Suborder: Polyphaga
- Infraorder: Scarabaeiformia
- Family: Scarabaeidae
- Genus: Heteronyx
- Species: H. sydneyanus

Binomial name
- Heteronyx sydneyanus Blackburn, 1890

Species of beetle

Heteronyx sydneyanus is a species of beetle of the family Scarabaeidae. It is found in Australia (New South Wales).

== Description ==
Adults reach a length of about 5 mm (0.20 in). They are testaceous. The clypeus has a smooth, unpunctured area and the disc of the pronotum is densely . Both the pronotum and elytra are covered with short setae, with a few long setae at the apical declivity.
