= Heteronyx callabonnae =

Scientific classification
- Kingdom: Animalia
- Phylum: Arthropoda
- Clade: Pancrustacea
- Class: Insecta
- Order: Coleoptera
- Suborder: Polyphaga
- Infraorder: Scarabaeiformia
- Family: Scarabaeidae
- Genus: Heteronyx
- Species: H. callabonnae

Binomial name
- Heteronyx callabonnae Blackburn, 1909

Species of beetle

Heteronyx callabonnae is a species of beetle of the family Scarabaeidae. It is found in Australia (South Australia, Northern Territory).

== Description ==
Adults reach a length of about 8–9 mm (0.31–0.35 in). They are pale castaneous, except for the edges of the pronotum, scutellum and sutural edges of the elytra. There are pale setae on the discs of the pronotum and elytra.
