= Heteronyx ovatus =

Scientific classification
- Kingdom: Animalia
- Phylum: Arthropoda
- Clade: Pancrustacea
- Class: Insecta
- Order: Coleoptera
- Suborder: Polyphaga
- Infraorder: Scarabaeiformia
- Family: Scarabaeidae
- Genus: Heteronyx
- Species: H. ovatus

Binomial name
- Heteronyx ovatus Blanchard, 1850

Synonyms
- Heteronyx inconspicuus Blackburn, 1910

Species of beetle

Heteronyx ovatus is a species of beetle of the family Scarabaeidae. It is found in Australia (Tasmania, New South Wales, Victoria, Australian Capital Territory).

== Description ==
Adults reach a length of about 7–8.5 mm (0.28–0.33 in). They are dark castaneous. The pygidium is shining and the propygidium has a fringe of short setae along the posterior edge. There are also setae on the discs of the pronotum and elytra.
