= Heteronyx satelles =

Scientific classification
- Kingdom: Animalia
- Phylum: Arthropoda
- Clade: Pancrustacea
- Class: Insecta
- Order: Coleoptera
- Suborder: Polyphaga
- Infraorder: Scarabaeiformia
- Family: Scarabaeidae
- Genus: Heteronyx
- Species: H. satelles

Binomial name
- Heteronyx satelles Blackburn, 1888

Species of beetle

Heteronyx satelles is a species of beetle of the family Scarabaeidae. It is found in Australia (South Australia, Victoria, New South Wales).

== Description ==
Adults reach a length of about 6.5 mm (0.26 in). They are black or very dark castaneous, with the margins of the clypeus and legs reddish and the antennae yellowish brown. The frons, pronotum and elytra have some long setae.
