= Heteronyx viduus =

Scientific classification
- Kingdom: Animalia
- Phylum: Arthropoda
- Clade: Pancrustacea
- Class: Insecta
- Order: Coleoptera
- Suborder: Polyphaga
- Infraorder: Scarabaeiformia
- Family: Scarabaeidae
- Genus: Heteronyx
- Species: H. viduus

Binomial name
- Heteronyx viduus Blackburn, 1910

Synonyms
- Heteronyx glaber Lea, 1926; Heteronyx modestus Blackburn, 1910

Species of beetle

Heteronyx viduus is a species of beetle of the family Scarabaeidae. It is found in Australia (Queensland, Western Australia, Northern Territory).

== Description ==
Adults reach a length of about 4.5–6.5 mm (0.18–0.26 in). They are pale yellowish brown, with the head slightly darker than the pronotum. The dorsal surface is shining.
