= Heteronyx diversiceps =

Scientific classification
- Kingdom: Animalia
- Phylum: Arthropoda
- Clade: Pancrustacea
- Class: Insecta
- Order: Coleoptera
- Suborder: Polyphaga
- Infraorder: Scarabaeiformia
- Family: Scarabaeidae
- Genus: Heteronyx
- Species: H. diversiceps

Binomial name
- Heteronyx diversiceps Blackburn, 1890

Species of beetle

Heteronyx diversiceps is a species of beetle of the family Scarabaeidae. It is found in Australia (Tasmania, Victoria, South Australia).

== Description ==
Adults reach a length of about 5–6 mm (0.20–0.24 in). They are pale reddish brown, with a shining dorsal surface.
