= Heteronyx squalidus =

Scientific classification
- Kingdom: Animalia
- Phylum: Arthropoda
- Clade: Pancrustacea
- Class: Insecta
- Order: Coleoptera
- Suborder: Polyphaga
- Infraorder: Scarabaeiformia
- Family: Scarabaeidae
- Genus: Heteronyx
- Species: H. squalidus

Binomial name
- Heteronyx squalidus Blackburn, 1908

Species of beetle

Heteronyx squalidus is a species of beetle of the family Scarabaeidae. It is found in Australia (Western Australia).

== Description ==
Adults reach a length of about 8 mm (0.31 in). They are pale castaneous, with the clypeus and frons densely punctured and setose. The discs of the pronotum and elytra are punctured, with semi-erect setae and a few longer ones.
