= Heteronyx impar =

Scientific classification
- Kingdom: Animalia
- Phylum: Arthropoda
- Clade: Pancrustacea
- Class: Insecta
- Order: Coleoptera
- Suborder: Polyphaga
- Infraorder: Scarabaeiformia
- Family: Scarabaeidae
- Genus: Heteronyx
- Species: H. impar

Binomial name
- Heteronyx impar Blackburn, 1910

Synonyms
- Heteronyx convexicollis Blackburn, 1910

Species of beetle

Heteronyx impar is a species of beetle of the family Scarabaeidae. It is found in Australia (Queensland).

== Description ==
Adults reach a length of about 5.5–7 mm (0.22–0.28 in). They are dark castaneous with a shining surface and very tiny setae in the punctures.
