= Heteronyx advena =

Scientific classification
- Kingdom: Animalia
- Phylum: Arthropoda
- Clade: Pancrustacea
- Class: Insecta
- Order: Coleoptera
- Suborder: Polyphaga
- Infraorder: Scarabaeiformia
- Family: Scarabaeidae
- Genus: Heteronyx
- Species: H. advena

Binomial name
- Heteronyx advena Blackburn, 1890

Species of beetle

Heteronyx advena is a species of beetle of the family Scarabaeidae. It is found in Australia (Northern Territory).

== Description ==
Adults reach a length of about 6–8 mm (0.24–0.31 in). They are testaceous and shining. The disc of the pronotum is uniformly punctured and setose and the elytra are covered with short setae, mixed with some long, erect setae.
