= Heteronyx rhinastus =

Scientific classification
- Kingdom: Animalia
- Phylum: Arthropoda
- Clade: Pancrustacea
- Class: Insecta
- Order: Coleoptera
- Suborder: Polyphaga
- Infraorder: Scarabaeiformia
- Family: Scarabaeidae
- Genus: Heteronyx
- Species: H. rhinastus

Binomial name
- Heteronyx rhinastus Blackburn, 1890

Species of beetle

Heteronyx rhinastus is a species of beetle of the family Scarabaeidae. It is found in Australia (South Australia, Victoria).

== Description ==
Adults reach a length of about 9–12 mm (0.35–0.47 in). The apical edges of the elytra have a fringe of short setae.
