= Heteronyx lobatus =

Scientific classification
- Kingdom: Animalia
- Phylum: Arthropoda
- Clade: Pancrustacea
- Class: Insecta
- Order: Coleoptera
- Suborder: Polyphaga
- Infraorder: Scarabaeiformia
- Family: Scarabaeidae
- Genus: Heteronyx
- Species: H. lobatus

Binomial name
- Heteronyx lobatus Blackburn, 1888

Synonyms
- Heteronyx viator Blackburn, 1890

Species of beetle

Heteronyx lobatus is a species of beetle of the family Scarabaeidae. It is found in Australia (South Australia, Victoria).

== Description ==
Adults reach a length of about 8 mm (0.31 in). They are dark castaneous.
