= Heteronyx castaneus =

Scientific classification
- Kingdom: Animalia
- Phylum: Arthropoda
- Clade: Pancrustacea
- Class: Insecta
- Order: Coleoptera
- Suborder: Polyphaga
- Infraorder: Scarabaeiformia
- Family: Scarabaeidae
- Genus: Heteronyx
- Species: H. castaneus

Binomial name
- Heteronyx castaneus Blanchard, 1850

Synonyms
- Heteronyx obscurus Le Guillou, 1844

Species of beetle

Heteronyx castaneus is a species of beetle of the family Scarabaeidae. It is found in Australia (Northern Territory).

== Description ==
Adults reach a length of about 7–9 mm (0.28–0.35 in). They are black. The disc of the elytra is clothed with sparse, semi-erect setae and fewer erect setae of the same length.
