= Heteronyx nigellus =

Scientific classification
- Kingdom: Animalia
- Phylum: Arthropoda
- Clade: Pancrustacea
- Class: Insecta
- Order: Coleoptera
- Suborder: Polyphaga
- Infraorder: Scarabaeiformia
- Family: Scarabaeidae
- Genus: Heteronyx
- Species: H. nigellus

Binomial name
- Heteronyx nigellus (Erichson, 1842)

Synonyms
- Silopa nigella Erichson, 1842; Heteronyx maurulus Blackburn, 1910; Heteronyx pinguis Blackburn, 1890; Heteronyx holomelaena Blanchard, 1850

Species of beetle

Heteronyx nigellus is a species of beetle of the family Scarabaeidae. It is found in Australia (New South Wales, Victoria, South Australia, Tasmania).

== Description ==
Adults reach a length of about 8 mm (0.31 in). The head, pronotum and scutellum are black, while the elytra are reddish or pale yellow.
