= Heteronyx novitius =

Scientific classification
- Kingdom: Animalia
- Phylum: Arthropoda
- Clade: Pancrustacea
- Class: Insecta
- Order: Coleoptera
- Suborder: Polyphaga
- Infraorder: Scarabaeiformia
- Family: Scarabaeidae
- Genus: Heteronyx
- Species: H. novitius

Binomial name
- Heteronyx novitius Blackburn, 1910

Species of beetle

Heteronyx novitius is a species of beetle of the family Scarabaeidae. It is found in Australia (New South Wales, Tasmania).

== Description ==
Adults reach a length of about 5.5–6.5 mm (0.22–0.26 in). They are castaneous.
