= Heteronyx asperifrons =

Scientific classification
- Kingdom: Animalia
- Phylum: Arthropoda
- Clade: Pancrustacea
- Class: Insecta
- Order: Coleoptera
- Suborder: Polyphaga
- Infraorder: Scarabaeiformia
- Family: Scarabaeidae
- Genus: Heteronyx
- Species: H. asperifrons

Binomial name
- Heteronyx asperifrons Blackburn, 1909

Species of beetle

Heteronyx asperifrons is a species of beetle of the family Scarabaeidae. It is found in Australia (Western Australia).

== Description ==
Adults reach a length of about 9 mm (0.35 in). They have a pale yellowish brown body, with a fine, dark brown ridge on the head. The pygidium has long, sparse setae, as well as more numerous, short setae.
