= Heteronyx tindalei =

Scientific classification
- Kingdom: Animalia
- Phylum: Arthropoda
- Clade: Pancrustacea
- Class: Insecta
- Order: Coleoptera
- Suborder: Polyphaga
- Infraorder: Scarabaeiformia
- Family: Scarabaeidae
- Genus: Heteronyx
- Species: H. tindalei

Binomial name
- Heteronyx tindalei Britton, 1992

Synonyms
- Heteronyx insularis Lea, 1926

Species of beetle

Heteronyx tindalei is a species of beetle of the family Scarabaeidae. It is found in Australia (Northern Territory, Western Australia).

== Description ==
Adults reach a length of about 10 mm (0.39 in). They are dark castaneous, with the discs of the clypeus, frons, pronotum and elytra covered with short setae.
