= Heteronyx substriatus =

Scientific classification
- Kingdom: Animalia
- Phylum: Arthropoda
- Clade: Pancrustacea
- Class: Insecta
- Order: Coleoptera
- Suborder: Polyphaga
- Infraorder: Scarabaeiformia
- Family: Scarabaeidae
- Genus: Heteronyx
- Species: H. substriatus

Binomial name
- Heteronyx substriatus MacLeay, 1871

Species of beetle

Heteronyx substriatus is a species of beetle of the family Scarabaeidae. It is found in Australia (Queensland, New South Wales, Victoria, Tasmania).

== Description ==
Adults reach a length of about 7.5 mm (0.30 in).
