= Heteronyx caledoniae =

Scientific classification
- Kingdom: Animalia
- Phylum: Arthropoda
- Clade: Pancrustacea
- Class: Insecta
- Order: Coleoptera
- Suborder: Polyphaga
- Infraorder: Scarabaeiformia
- Family: Scarabaeidae
- Genus: Heteronyx
- Species: H. caledoniae

Binomial name
- Heteronyx caledoniae Fauvel, 1903

Species of beetle

Heteronyx caledoniae is a species of beetle of the family Scarabaeidae. It is found in New Caledonia.

== Description ==
Adults reach a length of about 15–18 mm (0.59–0.71 in). They have an oval, brownish with reddish-testaceous elytra, with the suture darkened. They are shiny, but sometimes with silky reflections on the elytra.
