= Heteronyx protervus =

Scientific classification
- Kingdom: Animalia
- Phylum: Arthropoda
- Clade: Pancrustacea
- Class: Insecta
- Order: Coleoptera
- Suborder: Polyphaga
- Infraorder: Scarabaeiformia
- Family: Scarabaeidae
- Genus: Heteronyx
- Species: H. protervus

Binomial name
- Heteronyx protervus Blackburn, 1892

Synonyms
- Heteronyx tropicus Blackburn, 1909

Species of beetle

Heteronyx protervus is a species of beetle of the family Scarabaeidae. It is found in Australia (Queensland).

== Description ==
Adults reach a length of about 10–12 mm (0.39–0.47 in). They are very dark castaneous to black and shining. The disc of the pronotum has sparse, irregularly distributed punctures and there are sparse setiferous punctures on the disc of the elytra. The setae are pale and erect.
