= Heteronyx granulifer =

Scientific classification
- Kingdom: Animalia
- Phylum: Arthropoda
- Clade: Pancrustacea
- Class: Insecta
- Order: Coleoptera
- Suborder: Polyphaga
- Infraorder: Scarabaeiformia
- Family: Scarabaeidae
- Genus: Heteronyx
- Species: H. granulifer

Binomial name
- Heteronyx granulifer Blackburn, 1889

Species of beetle

Heteronyx granulifer is a species of beetle of the family Scarabaeidae. It is found in Australia (South Australia).

== Description ==
Adults reach a length of about 10–12 mm (0.39–0.47 in). They are castaneous, with the discs of the pronotum and elytra covered with short, pale setae, as well as some long, yellowish ones.
