= Heteronyx nigrescens =

Scientific classification
- Kingdom: Animalia
- Phylum: Arthropoda
- Clade: Pancrustacea
- Class: Insecta
- Order: Coleoptera
- Suborder: Polyphaga
- Infraorder: Scarabaeiformia
- Family: Scarabaeidae
- Genus: Heteronyx
- Species: H. nigrescens

Binomial name
- Heteronyx nigrescens Blackburn, 1909

Synonyms
- Heteronyx nubilus Blackburn, 1909

Species of beetle

Heteronyx nigrescens is a species of beetle of the family Scarabaeidae. It is found in Australia (Victoria, South Australia).

== Description ==
Adults reach a length of about 6–8 mm (0.24–0.31 in). The frons and pronotum are black. The clypeus is also black, but has reddish lateral margins. The elytra and ventral surface are piceous, the antennae yellowish brown and the legs reddish brown.
