= Heteronyx laminatus =

Scientific classification
- Kingdom: Animalia
- Phylum: Arthropoda
- Clade: Pancrustacea
- Class: Insecta
- Order: Coleoptera
- Suborder: Polyphaga
- Infraorder: Scarabaeiformia
- Family: Scarabaeidae
- Genus: Heteronyx
- Species: H. laminatus

Binomial name
- Heteronyx laminatus Blackburn, 1890

Species of beetle

Heteronyx laminatus is a species of beetle of the family Scarabaeidae. It is found in Australia (South Australia).

== Description ==
Adults reach a length of about 6.5 mm (0.26 in). They are castaneous and the dorsal surface is covered with short, pale setae. The apical edges of the elytra have a dense fringe of short pale setae.
