= Heteronyx paniei =

Scientific classification
- Kingdom: Animalia
- Phylum: Arthropoda
- Clade: Pancrustacea
- Class: Insecta
- Order: Coleoptera
- Suborder: Polyphaga
- Infraorder: Scarabaeiformia
- Family: Scarabaeidae
- Genus: Heteronyx
- Species: H. paniei

Binomial name
- Heteronyx paniei Paulian, 1991

Species of beetle

Heteronyx paniei is a species of beetle of the family Scarabaeidae. It is found in New Caledonia.

== Description ==
Adults reach a length of about 16 mm (0.63 in). They have an oval, convex, blackish-brown body. The margins of the elytra and club of the antennae are reddish. They are shiny, with rather short, sparse pubescence.
