= Heteronyx punctipennis =

Scientific classification
- Kingdom: Animalia
- Phylum: Arthropoda
- Clade: Pancrustacea
- Class: Insecta
- Order: Coleoptera
- Suborder: Polyphaga
- Infraorder: Scarabaeiformia
- Family: Scarabaeidae
- Genus: Heteronyx
- Species: H. punctipennis

Binomial name
- Heteronyx punctipennis Blackburn, 1889

Synonyms
- Heteronyx cribripennis Blackburn, 1912

Species of beetle

Heteronyx punctipennis is a species of beetle of the family Scarabaeidae. It is found in Australia (Victoria, South Australia, Western Australia).

== Description ==
Adults reach a length of about 7–9 mm (0.28–0.35 in). They are dark castaneous, with the pronotum and elytra shining. The elytra have pale yellow membranous apical margins.
