= Heteronyx pubescens =

Scientific classification
- Kingdom: Animalia
- Phylum: Arthropoda
- Clade: Pancrustacea
- Class: Insecta
- Order: Coleoptera
- Suborder: Polyphaga
- Infraorder: Scarabaeiformia
- Family: Scarabaeidae
- Genus: Heteronyx
- Species: H. pubescens

Binomial name
- Heteronyx pubescens (Erichson, 1842)

Synonyms
- Silopa pubescens Erichson, 1842; Heteronyx carteri Blackburn, 1909; Heteronyx deceptor Blackburn, 1890; Heteronyx gracilipes Blackburn, 1888; Hymenoplia villigera Blanchard, 1846

Species of beetle

Heteronyx pubescens is a species of beetle of the family Scarabaeidae. It is found in Australia (Tasmania, Victoria, New South Wales).

== Description ==
Adults reach a length of about 8–12 mm (0.31–0.47 in). The clypeus is black with reddish margins and has some long pale, setae. The frons, pronotum and scutellum are black, while the elytra are reddish or black. The pronotum is densely clothed with long, pale setae and the elytra are clothed with similar setae, but with some longer ones scattered over the disc.
