= Heteronyx arcanus =

Scientific classification
- Kingdom: Animalia
- Phylum: Arthropoda
- Clade: Pancrustacea
- Class: Insecta
- Order: Coleoptera
- Suborder: Polyphaga
- Infraorder: Scarabaeiformia
- Family: Scarabaeidae
- Genus: Heteronyx
- Species: H. arcanus

Binomial name
- Heteronyx arcanus Blackburn, 1892

Synonyms
- Heteronyx umbrinus Blackburn, 1909

Species of beetle

Heteronyx arcanus is a species of beetle of the family Scarabaeidae. It is found in Australia (Queensland).

== Description ==
Adults reach a length of about 11–12 mm (0.43–0.47 in). They have a dark castaneous body. The pronotum is sparsely and irregularly punctured.
