= Heteronyx posticalis =

Scientific classification
- Kingdom: Animalia
- Phylum: Arthropoda
- Clade: Pancrustacea
- Class: Insecta
- Order: Coleoptera
- Suborder: Polyphaga
- Infraorder: Scarabaeiformia
- Family: Scarabaeidae
- Genus: Heteronyx
- Species: H. posticalis

Binomial name
- Heteronyx posticalis Blackburn, 1890

Synonyms
- Heteronyx approximans Blackburn, 1910

Species of beetle

Heteronyx posticalis is a species of beetle of the family Scarabaeidae. It is found in Australia (South Australia, New South Wales, Victoria, Tasmania).

== Description ==
Adults reach a length of about 7 mm (0.28 in). They are castaneous. The pygidium is covered with short, semi-erect setae and a few long, erect setae.
