= Heteronyx mimus =

Scientific classification
- Kingdom: Animalia
- Phylum: Arthropoda
- Clade: Pancrustacea
- Class: Insecta
- Order: Coleoptera
- Suborder: Polyphaga
- Infraorder: Scarabaeiformia
- Family: Scarabaeidae
- Genus: Heteronyx
- Species: H. mimus

Binomial name
- Heteronyx mimus Blackburn, 1890

Species of beetle

Heteronyx mimus is a species of beetle of the family Scarabaeidae. It is found in Australia (Western Australia, Northern Territory).

== Description ==
Adults reach a length of about 9–11 mm (0.35–0.43 in). They are pale castaneous, with semi-erect setae on the pronotum and elytra and with the clypeus and frons coarsely punctured.
