= Heteronyx subferruginea =

Scientific classification
- Kingdom: Animalia
- Phylum: Arthropoda
- Clade: Pancrustacea
- Class: Insecta
- Order: Coleoptera
- Suborder: Polyphaga
- Infraorder: Scarabaeiformia
- Family: Scarabaeidae
- Genus: Heteronyx
- Species: H. subferruginea

Binomial name
- Heteronyx subferruginea Burmeister, 1855

Species of beetle

Heteronyx subferruginea is a species of beetle of the family Scarabaeidae. It is found in Australia (Western Australia).

== Description ==
Adults reach a length of about 10.5 mm (0.41 in). They are dark castaneous, with the discs of the clypeus, frons and pronotum densely punctured, the punctures bearing pale setae. The anterior margin of the pronotum is shining and has some long setae. The elytra are less densely punctured and setose, and the apical edges have membranous margins.
