= Heteronyx tenebrosus =

Scientific classification
- Kingdom: Animalia
- Phylum: Arthropoda
- Clade: Pancrustacea
- Class: Insecta
- Order: Coleoptera
- Suborder: Polyphaga
- Infraorder: Scarabaeiformia
- Family: Scarabaeidae
- Genus: Heteronyx
- Species: H. tenebrosus

Binomial name
- Heteronyx tenebrosus Blackburn, 1909

Species of beetle

Heteronyx tenebrosus is a species of beetle of the family Scarabaeidae. It is found in Australia (Western Australia).

== Description ==
Adults reach a length of about 11–13 mm (0.43–0.51 in). The dorsal surface is black or brown, with long, pale setae.
