= Heteronyx tepperi =

Scientific classification
- Kingdom: Animalia
- Phylum: Arthropoda
- Clade: Pancrustacea
- Class: Insecta
- Order: Coleoptera
- Suborder: Polyphaga
- Infraorder: Scarabaeiformia
- Family: Scarabaeidae
- Genus: Heteronyx
- Species: H. tepperi

Binomial name
- Heteronyx tepperi Blackburn, 1888

Synonyms
- Heteronyx subfortis Blackburn, 1908

Species of beetle

Heteronyx tepperi is a species of beetle of the family Scarabaeidae. It is found in Australia (Western Australia, New South Wales, Victoria, South Australia).

== Description ==
Adults reach a length of about 7.5–9 mm (0.30–0.35 in). The head is black, with the anterior and lateral margins of the clypeus reddish. The disc of the pronotum is also black with reddish anterior and lateral margins. The elytra are black with some reddish near the suture. The antennae are yellowish brown and the legs are reddish.
