= Heteronyx peregrinus =

Scientific classification
- Kingdom: Animalia
- Phylum: Arthropoda
- Clade: Pancrustacea
- Class: Insecta
- Order: Coleoptera
- Suborder: Polyphaga
- Infraorder: Scarabaeiformia
- Family: Scarabaeidae
- Genus: Heteronyx
- Species: H. peregrinus

Binomial name
- Heteronyx peregrinus Blackburn, 1890

Synonyms
- Heteronyx macilentus Blackburn, 1910

Species of beetle

Heteronyx peregrinus is a species of beetle of the family Scarabaeidae. It is found in Australia (South Australia, Western Australia).

== Description ==
Adults reach a length of about 6–11 mm (0.24–0.43 in). They are pale castaneous, with the surface dull and clothed with dense, short, pale setae.
