= Heteronyx obesa =

Scientific classification
- Kingdom: Animalia
- Phylum: Arthropoda
- Clade: Pancrustacea
- Class: Insecta
- Order: Coleoptera
- Suborder: Polyphaga
- Infraorder: Scarabaeiformia
- Family: Scarabaeidae
- Genus: Heteronyx
- Species: H. obesa

Binomial name
- Heteronyx obesa Burmeister, 1855

Synonyms
- Heteronyx occidentalis Blackburn, 1888

Species of beetle

Heteronyx obesa is a species of beetle of the family Scarabaeidae. It is found in Australia (Western Australia).

== Description ==
Adults reach a length of about 7–14 mm (0.28–0.55 in). They are dark castaneous. The clypeus and frons are densely punctured, with short setae and the latter with two long setae above each eye. The pronotum and elytra are covered with semi-erect setae.
