= Heteronyx suavis =

Scientific classification
- Kingdom: Animalia
- Phylum: Arthropoda
- Clade: Pancrustacea
- Class: Insecta
- Order: Coleoptera
- Suborder: Polyphaga
- Infraorder: Scarabaeiformia
- Family: Scarabaeidae
- Genus: Heteronyx
- Species: H. suavis

Binomial name
- Heteronyx suavis Blackburn, 1909

Species of beetle

Heteronyx suavis is a species of beetle of the family Scarabaeidae. It is found in Australia (Queensland).

== Description ==
Adults reach a length of about 8–11 mm (0.31–0.43 in).
