= Heteronyx jejunus =

Scientific classification
- Kingdom: Animalia
- Phylum: Arthropoda
- Clade: Pancrustacea
- Class: Insecta
- Order: Coleoptera
- Suborder: Polyphaga
- Infraorder: Scarabaeiformia
- Family: Scarabaeidae
- Genus: Heteronyx
- Species: H. jejunus

Binomial name
- Heteronyx jejunus Blackburn, 1888

Synonyms
- Heteronyx longulus Blackburn, 1890; Heteronyx lubricus Blackburn, 1890

Species of beetle

Heteronyx jejunus is a species of beetle of the family Scarabaeidae. It is found in Australia (South Australia).

== Description ==
Adults reach a length of about 4.5–6 mm (0.18–0.24 in). They are pale castaneous, with the edges of the clypeus, pronotum and sutural edge of the elytra black.
