= Heteronyx disjectus =

Scientific classification
- Kingdom: Animalia
- Phylum: Arthropoda
- Clade: Pancrustacea
- Class: Insecta
- Order: Coleoptera
- Suborder: Polyphaga
- Infraorder: Scarabaeiformia
- Family: Scarabaeidae
- Genus: Heteronyx
- Species: H. disjectus

Binomial name
- Heteronyx disjectus Blackburn, 1910

Synonyms
- Heteronyx nudus Blackburn, 1910

Species of beetle

Heteronyx disjectus is a species of beetle of the family Scarabaeidae. It is found in Australia (Western Australia).

== Description ==
Adults reach a length of about 6.5–9 mm (0.26–0.35 in). They are castaneous, with tiny setae on the shining pronotum. The setae on the elytra are very fine, with a few longer, erect setae.
