= Heteronyx cervina =

Scientific classification
- Kingdom: Animalia
- Phylum: Arthropoda
- Clade: Pancrustacea
- Class: Insecta
- Order: Coleoptera
- Suborder: Polyphaga
- Infraorder: Scarabaeiformia
- Family: Scarabaeidae
- Genus: Heteronyx
- Species: H. cervina

Binomial name
- Heteronyx cervina (Boisduval, 1835)

Synonyms
- Sericesthis cervina Boisduval, 1835; Silopa tempestiva Erichson, 1842

Species of beetle

Heteronyx cervina is a species of beetle of the family Scarabaeidae. It is found in Australia (Australian Capital Territory, Tasmania).

== Description ==
Adults reach a length of about 4.9–8.5 mm (0.19–0.33 in). The colour of their body ranges from testaceous to castaneous. The discs of the clypeus, frons and elytra are covered with short setae and the edges of the pronotum and the sutural stria are dark brown or black.
