= Heteronyx pauxillus =

Scientific classification
- Kingdom: Animalia
- Phylum: Arthropoda
- Clade: Pancrustacea
- Class: Insecta
- Order: Coleoptera
- Suborder: Polyphaga
- Infraorder: Scarabaeiformia
- Family: Scarabaeidae
- Genus: Heteronyx
- Species: H. pauxillus

Binomial name
- Heteronyx pauxillus Blackburn, 1910

Species of beetle

Heteronyx pauxillus is a species of beetle of the family Scarabaeidae. It is found in Australia (Western Australia, Northern Territory).

== Description ==
Adults reach a length of about 5–6 mm (0.20–0.24 in). They are pale yellowish brown. The clypeus is dull, while the frons is shining, smooth and uniformly punctured. The elytra have some short setae on the disc. The pygidium is shining and sparsely punctured, with a few semi-erect setae near the apex.
