= Heteronyx normalis =

Scientific classification
- Kingdom: Animalia
- Phylum: Arthropoda
- Clade: Pancrustacea
- Class: Insecta
- Order: Coleoptera
- Suborder: Polyphaga
- Infraorder: Scarabaeiformia
- Family: Scarabaeidae
- Genus: Heteronyx
- Species: H. normalis

Binomial name
- Heteronyx normalis Blackburn, 1889

Species of beetle

Heteronyx normalis is a species of beetle of the family Scarabaeidae. It is found in Australia (Victoria, South Australia).

== Description ==
Adults reach a length of about 8–12 mm (0.31–0.47 in). They are dark castaneous to black. The dorsal surface has dense, fine punctuation and the propygidium has a dense fringe of short pale setae.
