= Heteronyx frontalis =

Scientific classification
- Kingdom: Animalia
- Phylum: Arthropoda
- Clade: Pancrustacea
- Class: Insecta
- Order: Coleoptera
- Suborder: Polyphaga
- Infraorder: Scarabaeiformia
- Family: Scarabaeidae
- Genus: Heteronyx
- Species: H. frontalis

Binomial name
- Heteronyx frontalis Blackburn, 1888

Synonyms
- Heteronyx nitidus Blackburn, 1890

Species of beetle

Heteronyx frontalis is a species of beetle of the family Scarabaeidae. It is found in Australia (South Australia, Northern Territory, Western Australia).

== Description ==
Adults reach a length of about 10–12 mm (0.39–0.47 in).
