= Heteronyx tarsalis =

Scientific classification
- Kingdom: Animalia
- Phylum: Arthropoda
- Clade: Pancrustacea
- Class: Insecta
- Order: Coleoptera
- Suborder: Polyphaga
- Infraorder: Scarabaeiformia
- Family: Scarabaeidae
- Genus: Heteronyx
- Species: H. tarsalis

Binomial name
- Heteronyx tarsalis Blackburn, 1909

Synonyms
- Heteronyx griffithi Blackburn, 1909

Species of beetle

Heteronyx tarsalis is a species of beetle of the family Scarabaeidae. It is found in Australia (Northern Territory).

== Description ==
Adults reach a length of about 7–10 mm (0.28–0.39 in). They are dark castaneous, with a shining dorsal surface and some setae on the clypeus.
