= Heteronyx subglaber =

Scientific classification
- Kingdom: Animalia
- Phylum: Arthropoda
- Clade: Pancrustacea
- Class: Insecta
- Order: Coleoptera
- Suborder: Polyphaga
- Infraorder: Scarabaeiformia
- Family: Scarabaeidae
- Genus: Heteronyx
- Species: H. subglaber

Binomial name
- Heteronyx subglaber MacLeay, 1888

Species of beetle

Heteronyx subglaber is a species of beetle of the family Scarabaeidae. It is found in Australia (Western Australia, Northern Territory).

== Description ==
Adults reach a length of about 7 mm (0.28 in). The discs of the clypeus and frons are punctured and clothed with short setae, while the pronotum and elytra are sparsely punctured and covered with tiny setae.
