= Heteronyx subfuscus =

Scientific classification
- Kingdom: Animalia
- Phylum: Arthropoda
- Clade: Pancrustacea
- Class: Insecta
- Order: Coleoptera
- Suborder: Polyphaga
- Infraorder: Scarabaeiformia
- Family: Scarabaeidae
- Genus: Heteronyx
- Species: H. subfuscus

Binomial name
- Heteronyx subfuscus MacLeay, 1888

Synonyms
- Heteronyx sordidus Blackburn, 1910; Heteronyx subcylindricus Blackburn, 1910; Heteronyx subvittatus MacLeay, 1888

Species of beetle

Heteronyx subfuscus is a species of beetle of the family Scarabaeidae. It is found in Australia (Queensland, Western Australia).

== Description ==
Adults reach a length of about 6.4–7.6 mm (0.25–0.30 in). They are dark castaneous.
