= Heteronyx hispidulus =

Scientific classification
- Kingdom: Animalia
- Phylum: Arthropoda
- Clade: Pancrustacea
- Class: Insecta
- Order: Coleoptera
- Suborder: Polyphaga
- Infraorder: Scarabaeiformia
- Family: Scarabaeidae
- Genus: Heteronyx
- Species: H. hispidulus

Binomial name
- Heteronyx hispidulus Blackburn, 1908

Species of beetle

Heteronyx hispidulus is a species of beetle of the family Scarabaeidae. It is found in Australia (Western Australia).

== Description ==
Adults reach a length of about 11–13 mm (0.43–0.51 in). They are dark castaneous, with long setae on the edges of the pronotum and elytra.
