= Heteronyx confertus =

Scientific classification
- Kingdom: Animalia
- Phylum: Arthropoda
- Clade: Pancrustacea
- Class: Insecta
- Order: Coleoptera
- Suborder: Polyphaga
- Infraorder: Scarabaeiformia
- Family: Scarabaeidae
- Genus: Heteronyx
- Species: H. confertus

Binomial name
- Heteronyx confertus Blackburn, 1910

Species of beetle

Heteronyx confertus is a species of beetle of the family Scarabaeidae. It is found in Australia (Victoria).

== Description ==
Adults reach a length of about 12 mm (0.47 in). They are similar to Heteronyx torvus, but the pale setae on disc of the pronotum and elytra are uniform in length.
