= Heteronyx lindi =

Scientific classification
- Kingdom: Animalia
- Phylum: Arthropoda
- Clade: Pancrustacea
- Class: Insecta
- Order: Coleoptera
- Suborder: Polyphaga
- Infraorder: Scarabaeiformia
- Family: Scarabaeidae
- Genus: Heteronyx
- Species: H. lindi

Binomial name
- Heteronyx lindi Blackburn, 1888

Synonyms
- Heteronyx submetallicus Blackburn, 1888

Species of beetle

Heteronyx lindi is a species of beetle of the family Scarabaeidae. It is found in Australia (South Australia, New South Wales).

== Description ==
Adults reach a length of about 4 mm (0.16 in). The head and pronotum are black, while the elytra and ventral surface are piceous or black with a dull, bluish reflection. The legs are reddish brown and the antennae are brown. The dorsal surface is sparsely covered with short, pale whitish setae.
