= Heteronyx maculatus =

Scientific classification
- Kingdom: Animalia
- Phylum: Arthropoda
- Clade: Pancrustacea
- Class: Insecta
- Order: Coleoptera
- Suborder: Polyphaga
- Infraorder: Scarabaeiformia
- Family: Scarabaeidae
- Genus: Heteronyx
- Species: H. maculatus

Binomial name
- Heteronyx maculatus Blackburn, 1888

Species of beetle

Heteronyx maculatus is a species of beetle of the family Scarabaeidae. It is found in Australia (South Australia).

== Description ==
Adults reach a length of about 3.5–4.5 mm (0.14–0.18 in). The head, pronotum and elytra are black or dark brown, often with a pale reddish-yellow spot near the apex of the elytra. The ventral surface and legs are black, piceous or reddish brown and the antennae are dark brown. The dorsal surface is shining and has long, pale whitish setae.
