= Heteronyx borealis =

Scientific classification
- Kingdom: Animalia
- Phylum: Arthropoda
- Clade: Pancrustacea
- Class: Insecta
- Order: Coleoptera
- Suborder: Polyphaga
- Infraorder: Scarabaeiformia
- Family: Scarabaeidae
- Genus: Heteronyx
- Species: H. borealis

Binomial name
- Heteronyx borealis Blackburn, 1889

Species of beetle

Heteronyx borealis is a species of beetle of the family Scarabaeidae. It is found in Australia (Northern Territory).

== Description ==
Adults reach a length of about 7 mm (0.28 in). They are similar to Heteronyx australis.
