= Heteronyx solidus =

Scientific classification
- Kingdom: Animalia
- Phylum: Arthropoda
- Clade: Pancrustacea
- Class: Insecta
- Order: Coleoptera
- Suborder: Polyphaga
- Infraorder: Scarabaeiformia
- Family: Scarabaeidae
- Genus: Heteronyx
- Species: H. solidus

Binomial name
- Heteronyx solidus Blackburn, 1888

Species of beetle

Heteronyx solidus is a species of beetle of the family Scarabaeidae. It is found in Australia (Northern Territory).

== Description ==
Adults reach a length of about 10 mm (0.39 in). They are dark brown. The disc of the clypeus is densely punctured, while the disc of the pronotum is sparsely, with the punctures bearing long setae. The elytra are also sparsely punctured and the punctures bearing erect setae.
