= Heteronyx electus =

Scientific classification
- Kingdom: Animalia
- Phylum: Arthropoda
- Clade: Pancrustacea
- Class: Insecta
- Order: Coleoptera
- Suborder: Polyphaga
- Infraorder: Scarabaeiformia
- Family: Scarabaeidae
- Genus: Heteronyx
- Species: H. electus

Binomial name
- Heteronyx electus Blackburn, 1889

Species of beetle

Heteronyx electus is a species of beetle of the family Scarabaeidae. It is found in Australia (South Australia).

== Description ==
Adults reach a length of about 7–10 mm (0.28–0.39 in). They are castaneous, with the pygidium clothed with short, semi-erect setae.
