= Heteronyx lateritius =

Scientific classification
- Kingdom: Animalia
- Phylum: Arthropoda
- Clade: Pancrustacea
- Class: Insecta
- Order: Coleoptera
- Suborder: Polyphaga
- Infraorder: Scarabaeiformia
- Family: Scarabaeidae
- Genus: Heteronyx
- Species: H. lateritius

Binomial name
- Heteronyx lateritius Blackburn, 1889

Synonyms
- Heteronyx validus Blackburn, 1910

Species of beetle

Heteronyx lateritius is a species of beetle of the family Scarabaeidae. It is found in Australia (South Australia).

== Description ==
Adults reach a length of about 7 mm (0.28 in). They are castaneous, the pygidium clothed with short, semi-erect setae, as well as some long, erect ones.
