= Heteronyx ambiguus =

Scientific classification
- Kingdom: Animalia
- Phylum: Arthropoda
- Clade: Pancrustacea
- Class: Insecta
- Order: Coleoptera
- Suborder: Polyphaga
- Infraorder: Scarabaeiformia
- Family: Scarabaeidae
- Genus: Heteronyx
- Species: H. ambiguus

Binomial name
- Heteronyx ambiguus Blackburn, 1910

Species of beetle

Heteronyx ambiguus is a species of beetle of the family Scarabaeidae. It is found in Australia (Western Australia).

== Description ==
Adults reach a length of about 6–8 mm (0.24–0.31 in). They have a dark reddish brown body. The punctures on the disc of both the pronotum and elytra bear minute setae.
