= Heteronyx alpicola =

Scientific classification
- Kingdom: Animalia
- Phylum: Arthropoda
- Clade: Pancrustacea
- Class: Insecta
- Order: Coleoptera
- Suborder: Polyphaga
- Infraorder: Scarabaeiformia
- Family: Scarabaeidae
- Genus: Heteronyx
- Species: H. alpicola

Binomial name
- Heteronyx alpicola Blackburn, 1892

Species of beetle

Heteronyx alpicola is a species of beetle of the family Scarabaeidae. It is found in Australia (New South Wales, Victoria, Australian Capital Territory).

== Description ==
Adults reach a length of about 7–8 mm (0.28–0.31 in). They are moderately shiny and ferruginous and rather sparsely covered with short, tawny hairs.
