= Heteronyx prosper =

Scientific classification
- Kingdom: Animalia
- Phylum: Arthropoda
- Clade: Pancrustacea
- Class: Insecta
- Order: Coleoptera
- Suborder: Polyphaga
- Infraorder: Scarabaeiformia
- Family: Scarabaeidae
- Genus: Heteronyx
- Species: H. prosper

Binomial name
- Heteronyx prosper Blackburn, 1909

Species of beetle

Heteronyx prosper is a species of beetle of the family Scarabaeidae. It is found in Australia (Western Australia).

== Description ==
Adults reach a length of about 6–7 mm (0.24–0.28 in). They are pale castaneous. The elytra are shining, except near the apex. The pygidium has short, erect setae and the propygidium is yellowish with a dark brown ridge at the posterior edge.
