= Heteronyx crinitus =

Scientific classification
- Kingdom: Animalia
- Phylum: Arthropoda
- Clade: Pancrustacea
- Class: Insecta
- Order: Coleoptera
- Suborder: Polyphaga
- Infraorder: Scarabaeiformia
- Family: Scarabaeidae
- Genus: Heteronyx
- Species: H. crinitus

Binomial name
- Heteronyx crinitus Blackburn, 1910

Species of beetle

Heteronyx crinitus is a species of beetle of the family Scarabaeidae. It is found in Australia (Tasmania, Victoria, New South Wales).

== Description ==
Adults reach a length of about 10 mm (0.39 in). They are dull and black with piceous antennae. The frons is clothed with long, pale orange setae. The pronotum and elytra (near the base) also have long setae, but these are pale.
