= Heteronyx salebrosus =

Scientific classification
- Kingdom: Animalia
- Phylum: Arthropoda
- Clade: Pancrustacea
- Class: Insecta
- Order: Coleoptera
- Suborder: Polyphaga
- Infraorder: Scarabaeiformia
- Family: Scarabaeidae
- Genus: Heteronyx
- Species: H. salebrosus

Binomial name
- Heteronyx salebrosus Blackburn, 1909

Species of beetle

Heteronyx salebrosus is a species of beetle of the family Scarabaeidae. It is found in Australia (Queensland).

== Description ==
Adults reach a length of about 12 mm (0.47 in). They are castaneous, with the clypeus densely punctured and with short semi-erect, as well as some long, erect setae. The pronotum has some long setae on the disc and a few very long ones on the anterior margin. The setae on the disc of the elytra are like those on the pronotum.
