= Heteronyx sulcifrons =

Scientific classification
- Kingdom: Animalia
- Phylum: Arthropoda
- Clade: Pancrustacea
- Class: Insecta
- Order: Coleoptera
- Suborder: Polyphaga
- Infraorder: Scarabaeiformia
- Family: Scarabaeidae
- Genus: Heteronyx
- Species: H. sulcifrons

Binomial name
- Heteronyx sulcifrons Blackburn, 1909

Species of beetle

Heteronyx sulcifrons is a species of beetle of the family Scarabaeidae. It is found in Australia (Western Australia).

== Description ==
Adults reach a length of about 4.5 mm (0.18 in). They are yellowish brown, with the head and pronotum darker than the elytra.
