= Heteronyx furvus =

Scientific classification
- Kingdom: Animalia
- Phylum: Arthropoda
- Clade: Pancrustacea
- Class: Insecta
- Order: Coleoptera
- Suborder: Polyphaga
- Infraorder: Scarabaeiformia
- Family: Scarabaeidae
- Genus: Heteronyx
- Species: H. furvus

Binomial name
- Heteronyx furvus Blackburn, 1892

Species of beetle

Heteronyx furvus is a species of beetle of the family Scarabaeidae. It is found in Australia (Tasmania, Victoria, New South Wales, South Australia).

== Description ==
Adults reach a length of about 10 mm (0.39 in). They are dark castaneous. The pronotum is uniformly punctured and setose and the propygidium has a row of short, pale setae near the posterior edge.
