= Heteronyx excisus =

Scientific classification
- Kingdom: Animalia
- Phylum: Arthropoda
- Clade: Pancrustacea
- Class: Insecta
- Order: Coleoptera
- Suborder: Polyphaga
- Infraorder: Scarabaeiformia
- Family: Scarabaeidae
- Genus: Heteronyx
- Species: H. excisus

Binomial name
- Heteronyx excisus Blackburn, 1890

Synonyms
- Heteronyx intermedius Blackburn, 1909

Species of beetle

Heteronyx excisus is a species of beetle of the family Scarabaeidae. It is found in Australia (New South Wales, Tasmania, Australian Capital Territory, Victoria).

== Description ==
Adults reach a length of about 9–12 mm (0.35–0.47 in). They are dark castaneous. The dorsal surface of the head, pronotum and elytra is shining, densely and uniformly punctured and setose. The pygidium is covered with short, semi-erect setae and long, sparse more erect setae.
