= Heteronyx fortis =

Scientific classification
- Kingdom: Animalia
- Phylum: Arthropoda
- Clade: Pancrustacea
- Class: Insecta
- Order: Coleoptera
- Suborder: Polyphaga
- Infraorder: Scarabaeiformia
- Family: Scarabaeidae
- Genus: Heteronyx
- Species: H. fortis

Binomial name
- Heteronyx fortis Blackburn, 1888

Species of beetle

Heteronyx fortis is a species of beetle of the family Scarabaeidae. It is found in Australia (South Australia, Western Australia).

== Description ==
Adults reach a length of about 8 mm (0.31 in). They are black, with the antennae brown, and the legs piceous to black. The pronotum is dull and the elytra more shining. The setae on the disc of both the pronotum and elytra are tiny. The pygidium is dull and obscurely punctured.
