= Heteronyx oblongus =

Scientific classification
- Kingdom: Animalia
- Phylum: Arthropoda
- Clade: Pancrustacea
- Class: Insecta
- Order: Coleoptera
- Suborder: Polyphaga
- Infraorder: Scarabaeiformia
- Family: Scarabaeidae
- Genus: Heteronyx
- Species: H. oblongus

Binomial name
- Heteronyx oblongus Blanchard, 1850

Synonyms
- Heteronyx consanguineus Blackburn, 1892; Heteronyx dubius Blackburn, 1889; Heteronyx piger Blackburn, 1889; Heteronyx raucinasus Blackburn, 1889

Species of beetle

Heteronyx oblongus is a species of beetle of the family Scarabaeidae. It is found in Australia (Western Australia, South Australia, New South Wales, Australian Capital Territory, Victoria, Tasmania).

== Description ==
Adults reach a length of about 9–10 mm (0.35–0.39 in). The discs of the head, pronotum and elytra are dark castaneous to black. The pronotum has a shining band without punctures along the posterior margin. The pygidium is shining and punctured.
