= Heteronyx spadiceus =

Scientific classification
- Kingdom: Animalia
- Phylum: Arthropoda
- Clade: Pancrustacea
- Class: Insecta
- Order: Coleoptera
- Suborder: Polyphaga
- Infraorder: Scarabaeiformia
- Family: Scarabaeidae
- Genus: Heteronyx
- Species: H. spadiceus

Binomial name
- Heteronyx spadiceus Burmeister, 1855

Species of beetle

Heteronyx spadiceus is a species of beetle of the family Scarabaeidae. It is found in Australia (South Australia, Western Australia).

== Description ==
Adults reach a length of about 7–8 mm (0.28–0.31 in). They are bright castaneous. The lateral and apical edges of the elytra have pale, membranous margins.
