= Heteronyx puncticollis =

Scientific classification
- Kingdom: Animalia
- Phylum: Arthropoda
- Clade: Pancrustacea
- Class: Insecta
- Order: Coleoptera
- Suborder: Polyphaga
- Infraorder: Scarabaeiformia
- Family: Scarabaeidae
- Genus: Heteronyx
- Species: H. puncticollis

Binomial name
- Heteronyx puncticollis Blackburn, 1890

Species of beetle

Heteronyx puncticollis is a species of beetle of the family Scarabaeidae. It is found in Australia (Victoria, South Australia, New South Wales, Australian Capital Territory).

== Description ==
Adults reach a length of about 6–9 mm (0.24–0.35 in). The frons is densely punctured and the posterior edge of the propygidium has a dense fringe of short, pale setae. The pygidium is dull and sparsely covered with short setae.
