= Heteronyx incola =

Scientific classification
- Kingdom: Animalia
- Phylum: Arthropoda
- Clade: Pancrustacea
- Class: Insecta
- Order: Coleoptera
- Suborder: Polyphaga
- Infraorder: Scarabaeiformia
- Family: Scarabaeidae
- Genus: Heteronyx
- Species: H. incola

Binomial name
- Heteronyx incola Blackburn, 1889

Species of beetle

Heteronyx incola is a species of beetle of the family Scarabaeidae. It is found in Australia (South Australia).

== Description ==
Adults reach a length of about 7–9 mm (0.28–0.35 in). They are castaneous with a shining surface.
