= Heteronyx rufopiceus =

Scientific classification
- Kingdom: Animalia
- Phylum: Arthropoda
- Clade: Pancrustacea
- Class: Insecta
- Order: Coleoptera
- Suborder: Polyphaga
- Infraorder: Scarabaeiformia
- Family: Scarabaeidae
- Genus: Heteronyx
- Species: H. rufopiceus

Binomial name
- Heteronyx rufopiceus MacLeay, 1888

Synonyms
- Heteronyx breviceps Blackburn, 1889

Species of beetle

Heteronyx rufopiceus is a species of beetle of the family Scarabaeidae. It is found in Australia (Northern Territory, South Australia, Western Australia).

== Description ==
Adults reach a length of about 7–10 mm (0.28–0.39 in). They are dark castaneous, with the clypeus and frons densely punctured, the latter with two erect setae above each eye. The pronotum is uniformly punctured and has a shining unpunctured anterior margin. The pygidium is mostly glabrous and coarsely and sparsely punctured towards the margins.
