= Heteronyx iridiventris =

Scientific classification
- Kingdom: Animalia
- Phylum: Arthropoda
- Clade: Pancrustacea
- Class: Insecta
- Order: Coleoptera
- Suborder: Polyphaga
- Infraorder: Scarabaeiformia
- Family: Scarabaeidae
- Genus: Heteronyx
- Species: H. iridiventris

Binomial name
- Heteronyx iridiventris Blackburn, 1890

Species of beetle

Heteronyx iridiventris is a species of beetle of the family Scarabaeidae. It is found in Australia (South Australia, Victoria).

== Description ==
Adults reach a length of about 5.5–7 mm (0.22–0.28 in). The frons and pronotum are piceous, while the clypeus and elytra are castaneous (the latter with the basal half of the suture piceous). The pygidium is piceous, becoming reddish at the apex. The ventral surface is piceous and the legs are reddish brown. The surface of both the pronotum and elytra is dull with tiny, pale setae.
