= Heteronyx scalptus =

Scientific classification
- Kingdom: Animalia
- Phylum: Arthropoda
- Clade: Pancrustacea
- Class: Insecta
- Order: Coleoptera
- Suborder: Polyphaga
- Infraorder: Scarabaeiformia
- Family: Scarabaeidae
- Genus: Heteronyx
- Species: H. scalptus

Binomial name
- Heteronyx scalptus Blackburn, 1890

Synonyms
- Heteronyx difficilis Blackburn, 1912; Heteronyx xanthotrichus Blackburn, 1910

Species of beetle

Heteronyx scalptus is a species of beetle of the family Scarabaeidae. It is found in Australia (South Australia, Victoria, New South Wales).

== Description ==
Adults reach a length of about 9–13 mm (0.35–0.51 in). They are castaneous. The head, pronotum, elytra and pygidium are covered with short setae and the clypeus has some longer ones.
