= Heteronyx augustae =

Scientific classification
- Kingdom: Animalia
- Phylum: Arthropoda
- Clade: Pancrustacea
- Class: Insecta
- Order: Coleoptera
- Suborder: Polyphaga
- Infraorder: Scarabaeiformia
- Family: Scarabaeidae
- Genus: Heteronyx
- Species: H. augustae

Binomial name
- Heteronyx augustae Blackburn, 1889

Synonyms
- Heteronyx decorus Blackburn, 1892; Heteronyx anceps Blackburn, 1889

Species of beetle

Heteronyx augustae is a species of beetle of the family Scarabaeidae. It is found in Australia (South Australia, Western Australia).

== Description ==
Adults reach a length of about 9–11 mm (0.35–0.43 in). They are similar to Heteronyx glabratus, but the posterior angles of the pronotum are more broadly rounded.
