= Heteronyx unicolor =

Scientific classification
- Kingdom: Animalia
- Phylum: Arthropoda
- Clade: Pancrustacea
- Class: Insecta
- Order: Coleoptera
- Suborder: Polyphaga
- Infraorder: Scarabaeiformia
- Family: Scarabaeidae
- Genus: Heteronyx
- Species: H. unicolor

Binomial name
- Heteronyx unicolor Blanchard, 1850

Synonyms
- Heteronyx campestris Blackburn, 1910; Heteronyx auricomus Blackburn, 1889

Species of beetle

Heteronyx unicolor is a species of beetle of the family Scarabaeidae. It is found in Australia (Tasmania, New South Wales, Australian Capital Territory).

== Description ==
Adults reach a length of about 7–9 mm (0.28–0.35 in). They are pale castaneous, with short setae. The disc of the elytra also have some long pale setae.
