= Heteronyx declaratus =

Scientific classification
- Kingdom: Animalia
- Phylum: Arthropoda
- Clade: Pancrustacea
- Class: Insecta
- Order: Coleoptera
- Suborder: Polyphaga
- Infraorder: Scarabaeiformia
- Family: Scarabaeidae
- Genus: Heteronyx
- Species: H. declaratus

Binomial name
- Heteronyx declaratus Blackburn, 1909

Species of beetle

Heteronyx declaratus is a species of beetle of the family Scarabaeidae. It is found in Australia (Queensland).

== Description ==
Adults reach a length of about 4.5–6.5 mm (0.18–0.26 in). They have a dark castaneous body. The anterior margin of the pronotum is shining black and the disc is very coarsely and irregularly punctured, with recumbent setae. The setae on the disc of the elytra are semi-erect.
