= Heteronyx rufomarginatus =

Scientific classification
- Kingdom: Animalia
- Phylum: Arthropoda
- Clade: Pancrustacea
- Class: Insecta
- Order: Coleoptera
- Suborder: Polyphaga
- Infraorder: Scarabaeiformia
- Family: Scarabaeidae
- Genus: Heteronyx
- Species: H. rufomarginatus

Binomial name
- Heteronyx rufomarginatus Blanchard, 1850

Species of beetle

Heteronyx rufomarginatus is a species of beetle of the family Scarabaeidae. It is found in Australia (Victoria, Tasmania).

== Description ==
Adults reach a length of about 9–10 mm (0.35–0.39 in). The discs of the frons, pronotum and elytra are dark brown with reddish margins. The pygidium is shining.
