= Heteronyx elytrurus =

Scientific classification
- Kingdom: Animalia
- Phylum: Arthropoda
- Clade: Pancrustacea
- Class: Insecta
- Order: Coleoptera
- Suborder: Polyphaga
- Infraorder: Scarabaeiformia
- Family: Scarabaeidae
- Genus: Heteronyx
- Species: H. elytrurus

Binomial name
- Heteronyx elytrurus Blackburn, 1909

Species of beetle

Heteronyx elytrurus is a species of beetle of the family Scarabaeidae. It is found in Australia (New South Wales, Victoria).

== Description ==
Adults reach a length of about 5–7 mm (0.20–0.28 in). The head, pronotum and scutellum are very dark brown or black, while the elytra are reddish yellow.
