= Heteronyx aequalis =

Scientific classification
- Kingdom: Animalia
- Phylum: Arthropoda
- Clade: Pancrustacea
- Class: Insecta
- Order: Coleoptera
- Suborder: Polyphaga
- Infraorder: Scarabaeiformia
- Family: Scarabaeidae
- Genus: Heteronyx
- Species: H. aequalis

Binomial name
- Heteronyx aequalis Blackburn, 1888

Synonyms
- Heteronyx debilicollis Blackburn, 1909; Heteronyx taeniensis Blackburn, 1909

Species of beetle

Heteronyx aequalis is a species of beetle of the family Scarabaeidae. It is found in Australia (Victoria, New South Wales, Australian Capital Territory, Queensland, Tasmania).

== Description ==
Adults reach a length of about 7–8.5 mm (0.28–0.33 in). They are pale reddish brown. The frons, pronotum and elytra are uniformly punctured and have short, semi-erect setae.
