= Heteronyx flavus =

Scientific classification
- Kingdom: Animalia
- Phylum: Arthropoda
- Clade: Pancrustacea
- Class: Insecta
- Order: Coleoptera
- Suborder: Polyphaga
- Infraorder: Scarabaeiformia
- Family: Scarabaeidae
- Genus: Heteronyx
- Species: H. flavus

Binomial name
- Heteronyx flavus Blackburn, 1890

Synonyms
- Heteronyx angustus Blackburn, 1890

Species of beetle

Heteronyx flavus, the honey beetle, is a species of beetle of the family Scarabaeidae. It is found in Australia (New South Wales, South Australia, Victoria).

== Description ==
Adults reach a length of about 7–8 mm (0.28–0.31 in). They are pale yellowish brown, with the clypeus very coarsely punctured and the frons finely punctured.
