= Heteronyx rectangulus =

Scientific classification
- Kingdom: Animalia
- Phylum: Arthropoda
- Clade: Pancrustacea
- Class: Insecta
- Order: Coleoptera
- Suborder: Polyphaga
- Infraorder: Scarabaeiformia
- Family: Scarabaeidae
- Genus: Heteronyx
- Species: H. rectangulus

Binomial name
- Heteronyx rectangulus Blackburn, 1910

Species of beetle

Heteronyx rectangulus is a species of beetle of the family Scarabaeidae. It is found in Australia (South Australia).

== Description ==
Adults reach a length of about 8 mm (0.31 in). They are castaneous, with the frons, pronotum and elytra shining. The pronotum is sparsely punctured with long setae and the apices of the elytra have a fringe of long, yellowish spines. The upper half of the pygidium is dull, while the rest is shining. The propygidium is pale yellowish brown.
