= Heteronyx grandis =

Scientific classification
- Kingdom: Animalia
- Phylum: Arthropoda
- Clade: Pancrustacea
- Class: Insecta
- Order: Coleoptera
- Suborder: Polyphaga
- Infraorder: Scarabaeiformia
- Family: Scarabaeidae
- Genus: Heteronyx
- Species: H. grandis

Binomial name
- Heteronyx grandis Blackburn, 1900

Species of beetle

Heteronyx grandis is a species of beetle of the family Scarabaeidae. It is found in Australia (Victoria, New South Wales).

== Description ==
Adults reach a length of about 12–17 mm (0.47–0.67 in). They are dark castaneous. There are dense, long pale yellow setae on the head, pronotum and elytra.
