= Heteronyx variegatus =

Scientific classification
- Kingdom: Animalia
- Phylum: Arthropoda
- Clade: Pancrustacea
- Class: Insecta
- Order: Coleoptera
- Suborder: Polyphaga
- Infraorder: Scarabaeiformia
- Family: Scarabaeidae
- Genus: Heteronyx
- Species: H. variegatus

Binomial name
- Heteronyx variegatus Blackburn, 1888

Species of beetle

Heteronyx variegatus is a species of beetle of the family Scarabaeidae. It is found in Australia (Western Australia).

== Description ==
Adults reach a length of about 5 mm (0.20 in). The head, anterior edge of the pronotum and scutellum are black, while the pronotum, elytra and ventral surface are yellowish brown.
