= Heteronyx bovilli =

Scientific classification
- Kingdom: Animalia
- Phylum: Arthropoda
- Clade: Pancrustacea
- Class: Insecta
- Order: Coleoptera
- Suborder: Polyphaga
- Infraorder: Scarabaeiformia
- Family: Scarabaeidae
- Genus: Heteronyx
- Species: H. bovilli

Binomial name
- Heteronyx bovilli Blackburn, 1890

Species of beetle

Heteronyx bovilli is a species of beetle of the family Scarabaeidae. It is found in Australia (Northern Territory, Queensland).

== Description ==
Adults reach a length of about 6.5–7.5 mm (0.26–0.30 in).
