= Heteronyx piceoniger =

Scientific classification
- Kingdom: Animalia
- Phylum: Arthropoda
- Clade: Pancrustacea
- Class: Insecta
- Order: Coleoptera
- Suborder: Polyphaga
- Infraorder: Scarabaeiformia
- Family: Scarabaeidae
- Genus: Heteronyx
- Species: H. piceoniger

Binomial name
- Heteronyx piceoniger MacLeay, 1888

Species of beetle

Heteronyx piceoniger is a species of beetle of the family Scarabaeidae. It is found in Australia (Western Australia).

== Description ==
Adults reach a length of about 11–15 mm (0.43–0.59 in). They are black or dark castaneous. The disc of the pronotum is irregularly punctured, with large unpunctured areas and the propygidium has a narrow posterior margin consisting of a row of punctures with short, pale setae. The setae on the disc of the elytra are erect.
