= Heteronyx exectus =

Scientific classification
- Kingdom: Animalia
- Phylum: Arthropoda
- Clade: Pancrustacea
- Class: Insecta
- Order: Coleoptera
- Suborder: Polyphaga
- Infraorder: Scarabaeiformia
- Family: Scarabaeidae
- Genus: Heteronyx
- Species: H. exectus

Binomial name
- Heteronyx exectus Blackburn, 1909

Species of beetle

Heteronyx exectus is a species of beetle of the family Scarabaeidae. It is found in Australia (Western Australia).

== Description ==
Adults reach a length of about 9–10 mm (0.35–0.39 in). The discs of the pronotum and elytra have tiny setae and the disc of the latter is shining. The apical edges of the elytra have a fringe of short setae. The pygidium is covered with short setae, mixed with some longer ones near the apex.
