= Heteronyx merus =

Scientific classification
- Kingdom: Animalia
- Phylum: Arthropoda
- Clade: Pancrustacea
- Class: Insecta
- Order: Coleoptera
- Suborder: Polyphaga
- Infraorder: Scarabaeiformia
- Family: Scarabaeidae
- Genus: Heteronyx
- Species: H. merus

Binomial name
- Heteronyx merus Blackburn, 1892

Synonyms
- Heteronyx oodnadattae Blackburn, 1909

Species of beetle

Heteronyx merus is a species of beetle of the family Scarabaeidae. It is found in Australia (Queensland, South Australia).

== Description ==
Adults reach a length of about 10–14 mm (0.39–0.55 in). They are dark castaneous. The disc of the pronotum has sparse, irregularly scattered punctures, bearing semi-erect setae, while the elytra have longitudinal striae consisting of coarse punctures, as well as some pale setae.
