= Heteronyx inornatus =

Scientific classification
- Kingdom: Animalia
- Phylum: Arthropoda
- Clade: Pancrustacea
- Class: Insecta
- Order: Coleoptera
- Suborder: Polyphaga
- Infraorder: Scarabaeiformia
- Family: Scarabaeidae
- Genus: Heteronyx
- Species: H. inornatus

Binomial name
- Heteronyx inornatus (Blackburn, 1900)

Synonyms
- Anacheirotus inornatus Blackburn, 1900

Species of beetle

Heteronyx inornatus is a species of beetle of the family Scarabaeidae. It is found in Australia (South Australia, Northern Territory).

== Description ==
Adults reach a length of about 4.5–6 mm (0.18–0.24 in). They have a pale testaceous body, with the edges of the clypeus and pronotum dark brown.
