= Heteronyx comans =

Scientific classification
- Kingdom: Animalia
- Phylum: Arthropoda
- Clade: Pancrustacea
- Class: Insecta
- Order: Coleoptera
- Suborder: Polyphaga
- Infraorder: Scarabaeiformia
- Family: Scarabaeidae
- Genus: Heteronyx
- Species: H. comans

Binomial name
- Heteronyx comans Blackburn, 1909

Species of beetle

Heteronyx comans is a species of beetle of the family Scarabaeidae. It is found in Australia (Tasmania, New South Wales).

== Description ==
Adults reach a length of about 7–8 mm (0.28–0.31 in). The head, pronotum and antennae are piceous to black, while the elytra are piceous and reddish near the apices or reddish with a black base. There are sparse, long setae on the clypeus, frons, pronotum and part of the elytra. The remainder of the elytra (the distal two thirds) is clothed with shorter setae.
