= Heteronyx rusticus =

Scientific classification
- Kingdom: Animalia
- Phylum: Arthropoda
- Clade: Pancrustacea
- Class: Insecta
- Order: Coleoptera
- Suborder: Polyphaga
- Infraorder: Scarabaeiformia
- Family: Scarabaeidae
- Genus: Heteronyx
- Species: H. rusticus

Binomial name
- Heteronyx rusticus Blackburn, 1890

Species of beetle

Heteronyx rusticus is a species of beetle of the family Scarabaeidae. It is found in Australia (Queensland, Northern Territory).

== Description ==
Adults reach a length of about 5–7 mm (0.20–0.28 in). They are dark castaneous, with a shining dorsal surface and tiny setae. The pygidium is dull.
