= Heteronyx vicinus =

Scientific classification
- Kingdom: Animalia
- Phylum: Arthropoda
- Clade: Pancrustacea
- Class: Insecta
- Order: Coleoptera
- Suborder: Polyphaga
- Infraorder: Scarabaeiformia
- Family: Scarabaeidae
- Genus: Heteronyx
- Species: H. vicinus

Binomial name
- Heteronyx vicinus Blackburn, 1910

Species of beetle

Heteronyx vicinus is a species of beetle of the family Scarabaeidae. It is found in Australia (South Australia, Western Australia).

== Description ==
Adults reach a length of about 5–6 mm (0.20–0.24 in). The disc of the clypeus is dark brown to black, with the lateral margins pale reddish yellow. The pronotum is dark brown to black and the scutellum and elytra are dark brown. The dorsal surface is covered with pale setae and the surface is shining.
