= Heteronyx mulwalensis =

Scientific classification
- Kingdom: Animalia
- Phylum: Arthropoda
- Clade: Pancrustacea
- Class: Insecta
- Order: Coleoptera
- Suborder: Polyphaga
- Infraorder: Scarabaeiformia
- Family: Scarabaeidae
- Genus: Heteronyx
- Species: H. mulwalensis

Binomial name
- Heteronyx mulwalensis Blackburn, 1889

Species of beetle

Heteronyx mulwalensis is a species of beetle of the family Scarabaeidae. It is found in Australia (New South Wales).

== Description ==
Adults reach a length of about 10 mm (0.39 in). They are pale castaneous and covered with dense, short, semi-erect setae.
