= Heteronyx umbilicatus =

Scientific classification
- Kingdom: Animalia
- Phylum: Arthropoda
- Clade: Pancrustacea
- Class: Insecta
- Order: Coleoptera
- Suborder: Polyphaga
- Infraorder: Scarabaeiformia
- Family: Scarabaeidae
- Genus: Heteronyx
- Species: H. umbilicatus

Binomial name
- Heteronyx umbilicatus Fauvel, 1903

Species of beetle

Heteronyx umbilicatus is a species of beetle of the family Scarabaeidae. It is found in New Caledonia.

== Description ==
Adults reach a length of about 12 mm (0.47 in). They have a brown and dull body, with the head, thorax, and margins of the elytra darker and the ventral surface paler.
