= Heteronyx aequaliceps =

Scientific classification
- Kingdom: Animalia
- Phylum: Arthropoda
- Clade: Pancrustacea
- Class: Insecta
- Order: Coleoptera
- Suborder: Polyphaga
- Infraorder: Scarabaeiformia
- Family: Scarabaeidae
- Genus: Heteronyx
- Species: H. aequaliceps

Binomial name
- Heteronyx aequaliceps Blackburn, 1890

Species of beetle

Heteronyx aequaliceps is a species of beetle of the family Scarabaeidae. It is found in Australia (New South Wales, Australian Capital Territory).

== Description ==
Adults reach a length of about 7 mm (0.28 in). They are pale reddish brown and shining. There are short setae on the disc of the pronotum, elytra and pygidium.
