= Heteronyx terrena =

Scientific classification
- Kingdom: Animalia
- Phylum: Arthropoda
- Clade: Pancrustacea
- Class: Insecta
- Order: Coleoptera
- Suborder: Polyphaga
- Infraorder: Scarabaeiformia
- Family: Scarabaeidae
- Genus: Heteronyx
- Species: H. terrena

Binomial name
- Heteronyx terrena Blackburn, 1892

Synonyms
- Heteronyx elongatulus Dalla Torre, 1912; Heteronyx elongatus Blackburn, 1909; Heteronyx eremita Blackburn, 1909; Heteronyx hothamensis Blackburn, 1909; Heteronyx ingratus Blackburn, 1909

Species of beetle

Heteronyx terrena is a species of beetle of the family Scarabaeidae. It is found in Australia (Western Australia, New South Wales, Victoria, Australian Capital Territory).

== Description ==
Adults reach a length of about 6.5–10 mm (0.26–0.39 in). They are pale castaneous, with the dorsal surface covered with short, pale setae. The clypeus additionally has some erect setae.
