= Heteronyx rugosipennis =

Scientific classification
- Kingdom: Animalia
- Phylum: Arthropoda
- Clade: Pancrustacea
- Class: Insecta
- Order: Coleoptera
- Suborder: Polyphaga
- Infraorder: Scarabaeiformia
- Family: Scarabaeidae
- Genus: Heteronyx
- Species: H. rugosipennis

Binomial name
- Heteronyx rugosipennis MacLeay, 1871

Synonyms
- Heteronyx dux Blackburn, 1909; Heteronyx incomptus Blackburn, 1909

Species of beetle

Heteronyx rugosipennis is a species of beetle of the family Scarabaeidae. It is found in Australia (Queensland, New South Wales, Australian Capital Territory).

== Description ==
Adults reach a length of about 11–14 mm (0.43–0.55 in). They are castaneous, with the dorsal surface covered with short setae and some longer ones. The lateral margins of the pronotum have fringes of long setae.
