= Heteronyx lilliputanus =

Scientific classification
- Kingdom: Animalia
- Phylum: Arthropoda
- Clade: Pancrustacea
- Class: Insecta
- Order: Coleoptera
- Suborder: Polyphaga
- Infraorder: Scarabaeiformia
- Family: Scarabaeidae
- Genus: Heteronyx
- Species: H. lilliputanus

Binomial name
- Heteronyx lilliputanus Blackburn, 1890

Species of beetle

Heteronyx lilliputanus is a species of beetle of the family Scarabaeidae. It is found in Australia (South Australia).

== Description ==
Adults reach a length of about 4 mm (0.16 in). The head and pronotum are brown, while the elytra, ventral surface and legs are pale brown. There are long, pale setae on the head, pronotum and elytra.
