= Heteronyx capillatus =

Scientific classification
- Kingdom: Animalia
- Phylum: Arthropoda
- Clade: Pancrustacea
- Class: Insecta
- Order: Coleoptera
- Suborder: Polyphaga
- Infraorder: Scarabaeiformia
- Family: Scarabaeidae
- Genus: Heteronyx
- Species: H. capillatus

Binomial name
- Heteronyx capillatus MacLeay, 1888

Species of beetle

Heteronyx capillatus is a species of beetle of the family Scarabaeidae. It is found in Australia (Western Australia, Northern Territory).

== Description ==
Adults reach a length of about 8.5–11 mm (0.33–0.43 in). They are very dark castaneous to black.
