= Heteronyx rhinoceros =

Scientific classification
- Kingdom: Animalia
- Phylum: Arthropoda
- Clade: Pancrustacea
- Class: Insecta
- Order: Coleoptera
- Suborder: Polyphaga
- Infraorder: Scarabaeiformia
- Family: Scarabaeidae
- Genus: Heteronyx
- Species: H. rhinoceros

Binomial name
- Heteronyx rhinoceros Blackburn, 1892

Species of beetle

Heteronyx rhinoceros is a species of beetle of the family Scarabaeidae. It is found in Australia (Western Australia).

== Description ==
Adults reach a length of about 6–10 mm (0.24–0.39 in). They are pale yellowish brown.
