= Heteronyx setifer =

Scientific classification
- Kingdom: Animalia
- Phylum: Arthropoda
- Clade: Pancrustacea
- Class: Insecta
- Order: Coleoptera
- Suborder: Polyphaga
- Infraorder: Scarabaeiformia
- Family: Scarabaeidae
- Genus: Heteronyx
- Species: H. setifer

Binomial name
- Heteronyx setifer Blackburn, 1890

Species of beetle

Heteronyx setifer is a species of beetle of the family Scarabaeidae. It is found in Australia (South Australia, Western Australia).

== Description ==
Adults reach a length of about 9–13 mm (0.35–0.51 in). They are pale castaneous. The clypeus is densely punctured and has some long setae, while the frons only has one erect seta above each eye. The disc of the pronotum is dull and glabrous. The elytra is punctured, with most punctures without setae, but some larger punctures bear long setae. The pygidium has some long setae.
