= Heteronyx queenslandicus =

Scientific classification
- Kingdom: Animalia
- Phylum: Arthropoda
- Clade: Pancrustacea
- Class: Insecta
- Order: Coleoptera
- Suborder: Polyphaga
- Infraorder: Scarabaeiformia
- Family: Scarabaeidae
- Genus: Heteronyx
- Species: H. queenslandicus

Binomial name
- Heteronyx queenslandicus Blackburn, 1909

Species of beetle

Heteronyx queenslandicus is a species of beetle of the family Scarabaeidae. It is found in Australia (Queensland).

== Description ==
Adults reach a length of about 7 mm (0.28 in). They are castaneous. The clypeus and frons are very coarsely punctured and the pronotum and elytra are shining.
