= Heteronyx imitator =

Scientific classification
- Kingdom: Animalia
- Phylum: Arthropoda
- Clade: Pancrustacea
- Class: Insecta
- Order: Coleoptera
- Suborder: Polyphaga
- Infraorder: Scarabaeiformia
- Family: Scarabaeidae
- Genus: Heteronyx
- Species: H. imitator

Binomial name
- Heteronyx imitator Blackburn, 1909

Species of beetle

Heteronyx imitator is a species of beetle of the family Scarabaeidae. It is found in Australia (Western Australia).

== Description ==
Adults reach a length of about 4 mm (0.16 in). The head is black, the pronotum dark reddish brown (with a black anterior edge), the scutellum is also dark reddish brown, and the elytra and ventral surface are yellowish brown, the former darkened towards the base.
