= Heteronyx collaris =

Scientific classification
- Kingdom: Animalia
- Phylum: Arthropoda
- Clade: Pancrustacea
- Class: Insecta
- Order: Coleoptera
- Suborder: Polyphaga
- Infraorder: Scarabaeiformia
- Family: Scarabaeidae
- Genus: Heteronyx
- Species: H. collaris

Binomial name
- Heteronyx collaris Blackburn, 1890

Species of beetle

Heteronyx collaris is a species of beetle of the family Scarabaeidae. It is found in Australia (South Australia).

== Description ==
Adults reach a length of about 6 mm (0.24 in). They have a yellowish to pale reddish brown body. The propygidium has a row of punctures bearing short, fine setae.
