= Heteronyx bidentatus =

Scientific classification
- Kingdom: Animalia
- Phylum: Arthropoda
- Clade: Pancrustacea
- Class: Insecta
- Order: Coleoptera
- Suborder: Polyphaga
- Infraorder: Scarabaeiformia
- Family: Scarabaeidae
- Genus: Heteronyx
- Species: H. bidentatus

Binomial name
- Heteronyx bidentatus Blackburn, 1889

Species of beetle

Heteronyx bidentatus is a species of beetle of the family Scarabaeidae. It is found in Australia (Western Australia).

== Description ==
Adults reach a length of about 7–9 mm (0.28–0.35 in). They have a pale yellowish brown body. The discs of the frons, pronotum and elytra are punctured and clothed with short, pale, semi-erect setae. The anterior and posterior edges of the pronotum are dark brown.
