= Heteronyx rothei =

Scientific classification
- Kingdom: Animalia
- Phylum: Arthropoda
- Clade: Pancrustacea
- Class: Insecta
- Order: Coleoptera
- Suborder: Polyphaga
- Infraorder: Scarabaeiformia
- Family: Scarabaeidae
- Genus: Heteronyx
- Species: H. rothei

Binomial name
- Heteronyx rothei Blackburn, 1890

Species of beetle

Heteronyx rothei is a species of beetle of the family Scarabaeidae. It is found in Australia (South Australia, Victoria, Western Australia).

== Description ==
Adults reach a length of about 7.5–9 mm (0.30–0.35 in). They are castaneous. The clypeus is covered with short setae, as well as some long, erect ones. The frons and disc of the pronotum are shining. The elytra are sparsely setose, the lateral margins with long, dense setae.
