= Heteronyx infuscatus =

Scientific classification
- Kingdom: Animalia
- Phylum: Arthropoda
- Clade: Pancrustacea
- Class: Insecta
- Order: Coleoptera
- Suborder: Polyphaga
- Infraorder: Scarabaeiformia
- Family: Scarabaeidae
- Genus: Heteronyx
- Species: H. infuscatus

Binomial name
- Heteronyx infuscatus MacLeay, 1871

Synonyms
- Heteronyx fictus Blackburn, 1910; Heteronyx lucidus Blackburn, 1910; Heteronyx rotundifrons Blackburn, 1889

Species of beetle

Heteronyx infuscatus is a species of beetle of the family Scarabaeidae. It is found in Australia (New South Wales, Queensland, Victoria).

== Description ==
Adults reach a length of about 7–9 mm (0.28–0.35 in). They may be distinguished by the unusually long setae on the margins of pronotum and elytra.
