= Heteronyx nasutus =

Scientific classification
- Kingdom: Animalia
- Phylum: Arthropoda
- Clade: Pancrustacea
- Class: Insecta
- Order: Coleoptera
- Suborder: Polyphaga
- Infraorder: Scarabaeiformia
- Family: Scarabaeidae
- Genus: Heteronyx
- Species: H. nasutus

Binomial name
- Heteronyx nasutus Blackburn, 1889

Synonyms
- Heteronyx tridens Blackburn, 1892

Species of beetle

Heteronyx nasutus is a species of beetle of the family Scarabaeidae. It is found in Australia (South Australia, Western Australia, Northern Territory).

== Description ==
Adults reach a length of about 8–9 mm (0.31–0.35 in). They are castaneous, with the pronotum and elytra shining, but the pygidium dull with some long, fine setae.
