= Heteronyx pygmaeus =

Scientific classification
- Kingdom: Animalia
- Phylum: Arthropoda
- Clade: Pancrustacea
- Class: Insecta
- Order: Coleoptera
- Suborder: Polyphaga
- Infraorder: Scarabaeiformia
- Family: Scarabaeidae
- Genus: Heteronyx
- Species: H. pygmaeus

Binomial name
- Heteronyx pygmaeus Blackburn, 1910

Species of beetle

Heteronyx pygmaeus is a species of beetle of the family Scarabaeidae. It is found in Australia (Western Australia).

== Description ==
Adults reach a length of about 4.5–5 mm (0.18–0.20 in). They are yellowish brown, with the frons, pronotum and elytra dull and setose. The pronotum is covered with pale setae and the elytra are faintly striate.
