= Heteronyx sexualis =

Scientific classification
- Kingdom: Animalia
- Phylum: Arthropoda
- Clade: Pancrustacea
- Class: Insecta
- Order: Coleoptera
- Suborder: Polyphaga
- Infraorder: Scarabaeiformia
- Family: Scarabaeidae
- Genus: Heteronyx
- Species: H. sexualis

Binomial name
- Heteronyx sexualis Blackburn, 1909

Species of beetle

Heteronyx sexualis is a species of beetle of the family Scarabaeidae. It is found in Australia (Western Australia).

== Description ==
Adults reach a length of about 12–16 mm (0.47–0.63 in). They are similar to Heteronyx piceus, Heteronyx horridus and Heteronyx laticeps, but may be distinguished by the labrum which is smoothly rounded, with fine, uniform punctuation.
