= Heteronyx laticeps =

Scientific classification
- Kingdom: Animalia
- Phylum: Arthropoda
- Clade: Pancrustacea
- Class: Insecta
- Order: Coleoptera
- Suborder: Polyphaga
- Infraorder: Scarabaeiformia
- Family: Scarabaeidae
- Genus: Heteronyx
- Species: H. laticeps

Binomial name
- Heteronyx laticeps Burmeister, 1855

Synonyms
- Heteronyx coatesi Blackburn, 1909; Heteronyx holosericeus MacLeay, 1871

Species of beetle

Heteronyx laticeps is a species of beetle of the family Scarabaeidae. It is found in Australia (Queensland).

== Description ==
Adults reach a length of about 9–12 mm (0.35–0.47 in). They are similar to Heteronyx piceus, Heteronyx horridus and Heteronyx sexualis, but may be distinguished by the shape of the aedeagus, the presence of pale membranous margins on the apices of the elytra and the more densely punctured pronotum.
