= Heteronyx horridus =

Scientific classification
- Kingdom: Animalia
- Phylum: Arthropoda
- Clade: Pancrustacea
- Class: Insecta
- Order: Coleoptera
- Suborder: Polyphaga
- Infraorder: Scarabaeiformia
- Family: Scarabaeidae
- Genus: Heteronyx
- Species: H. horridus

Binomial name
- Heteronyx horridus Blackburn, 1888

Species of beetle

Heteronyx horridus is a species of beetle of the family Scarabaeidae. It is found in Australia (South Australia, New South Wales, Victoria, Australian Capital Territory).

== Description ==
Adults reach a length of about 11–16 mm (0.43–0.63 in). The dorsal and ventral surfaces are piceous. The apices of the elytra have a fringe of pointed spines and the propygidium has a dense row of short, pale setae.
