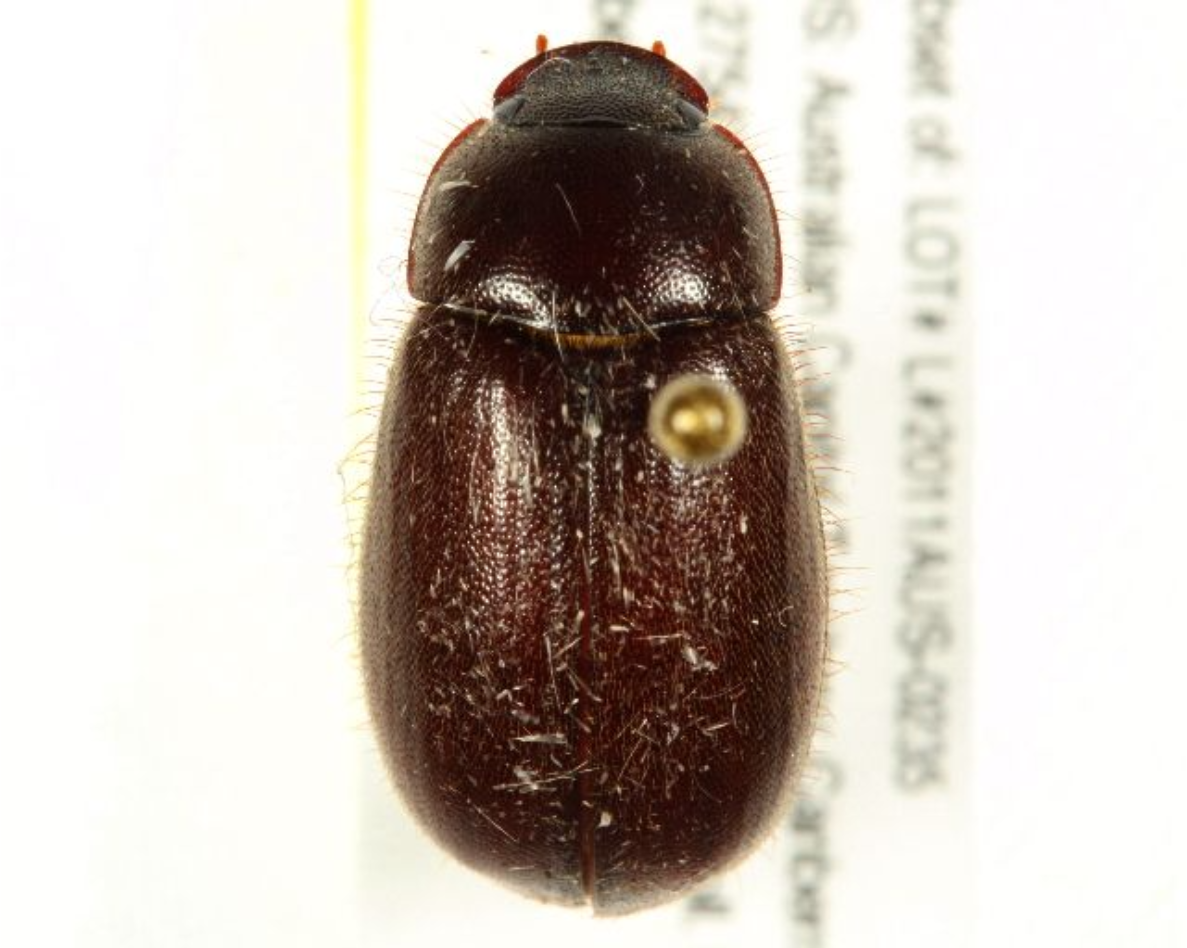

Scientific classification
- Kingdom: Animalia
- Phylum: Arthropoda
- Clade: Pancrustacea
- Class: Insecta
- Order: Coleoptera
- Suborder: Polyphaga
- Infraorder: Scarabaeiformia
- Family: Scarabaeidae
- Genus: Heteronyx
- Species: H. piceus

Binomial name
- Heteronyx piceus Blanchard, 1850

Synonyms
- Heteronyx ponderosus Blackburn, 1909; Heteronyx spissus Blackburn, 1909

= Heteronyx piceus =

Species of beetle

Heteronyx piceus is a species of beetle of the family Scarabaeidae. It is found in Australia (South Australia, New South Wales, Queensland, Australian Capital Territory, Victoria).

== Description ==
Adults reach a length of about 10–14 mm (0.39–0.55 in). They are castaneous to piceous, with a shining dorsal surface. The propygidium has a row of tiny whitish setae near the posterior edge. The disc of the pronotum is uniformly punctured.
