= Heteronyx badius =

Scientific classification
- Kingdom: Animalia
- Phylum: Arthropoda
- Clade: Pancrustacea
- Class: Insecta
- Order: Coleoptera
- Suborder: Polyphaga
- Infraorder: Scarabaeiformia
- Family: Scarabaeidae
- Genus: Heteronyx
- Species: H. badius

Binomial name
- Heteronyx badius MacLeay, 1888

Synonyms
- Heteronyx macleayi Blackburn, 1910; Heteronyx darwini Blackburn, 1889

Species of beetle

Heteronyx badius is a species of beetle of the family Scarabaeidae. It is found in Australia (Northern Territory, Queensland).

== Description ==
Adults reach a length of about 7–10 mm (0.28–0.39 in). They are very similar to Heteronyx australis, but may be distinguished by the denser punctuation on the pronotum and more rounded posterior angles.
