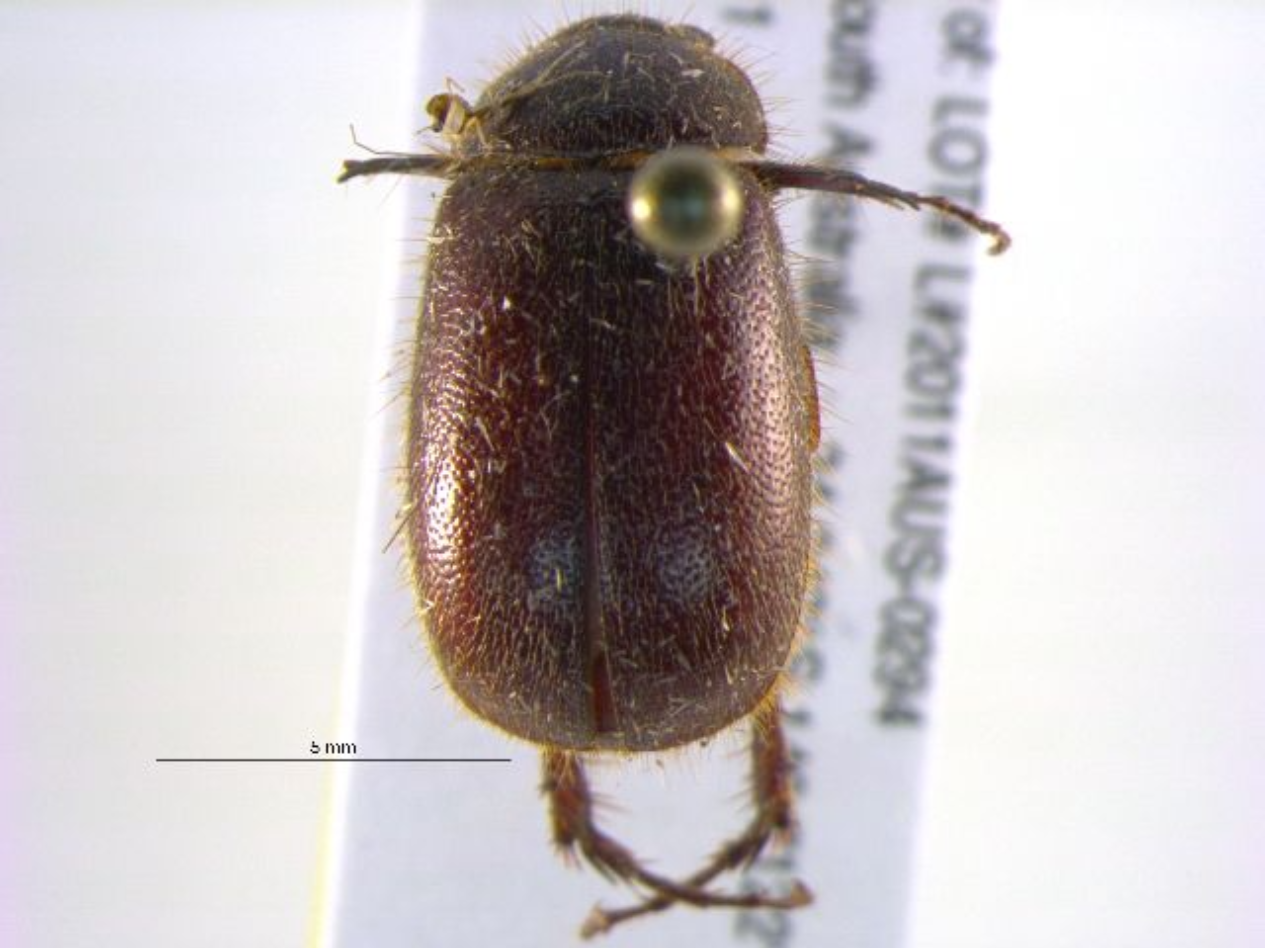

Scientific classification
- Kingdom: Animalia
- Phylum: Arthropoda
- Clade: Pancrustacea
- Class: Insecta
- Order: Coleoptera
- Suborder: Polyphaga
- Infraorder: Scarabaeiformia
- Family: Scarabaeidae
- Genus: Heteronyx
- Species: H. australis

Binomial name
- Heteronyx australis Guérin-Méneville, 1831

Synonyms
- Heteronyx pseudocastaneus Houston & Weir, 1992; Heteronyx conjunctus Blackburn, 1910; Heteronyx erichsoni Blackburn, 1910; Heteronyx farinensis Blackburn, 1910; Heteronyx hackeri Blackburn, 1910; Heteronyx olliffi Blackburn, 1910; Heteronyx vagans Blackburn, 1890; Heteronyx castaneus MacLeay, 1871; Heteronyx pubescens MacLeay, 1871

= Heteronyx australis =

Species of beetle

Heteronyx australis is a species of beetle of the family Scarabaeidae. It is found in Australia (Queensland, Northern Territory, Australian Capital Territory, New South Wales, Victoria, South Australia, Western Australia).

== Description ==
Adults reach a length of about 7–11 mm (0.28–0.43 in). They are dark reddish brown. The pronotum has dense punctures with long setae.
