= Heteronyx fumata =

Scientific classification
- Kingdom: Animalia
- Phylum: Arthropoda
- Clade: Pancrustacea
- Class: Insecta
- Order: Coleoptera
- Suborder: Polyphaga
- Infraorder: Scarabaeiformia
- Family: Scarabaeidae
- Genus: Heteronyx
- Species: H. fumata

Binomial name
- Heteronyx fumata (Erichson, 1842)

Synonyms
- Silopa fumata Erichson, 1842; Heteronyx rapax Blackburn, 1890; Heteronyx laticollis Blanchard, 1850; Heteronyx rubriceps Blanchard, 1850; Silopa hepatica Erichson, 1842

Species of beetle

Heteronyx fumata is a species of beetle of the family Scarabaeidae. It is found in Australia (Tasmania, Victoria, New South Wales, South Australia).

== Description ==
Adults reach a length of about 8–13 mm (0.31–0.51 in). They are very similar to Heteronyx additus, but larger. Furthermore, the shape of the clypeus is different.
