= Heteronyx additus =

Scientific classification
- Kingdom: Animalia
- Phylum: Arthropoda
- Clade: Pancrustacea
- Class: Insecta
- Order: Coleoptera
- Suborder: Polyphaga
- Infraorder: Scarabaeiformia
- Family: Scarabaeidae
- Genus: Heteronyx
- Species: H. additus

Binomial name
- Heteronyx additus Blackburn, 1909

Synonyms
- Heteronyx amoenus Blackburn, 1910

Species of beetle

Heteronyx additus is a species of beetle of the family Scarabaeidae. It is found in Australia (Western Australia).

== Description ==
Adults reach a length of about 9–12 mm (0.35–0.47 in). They are similar to Heteronyx quadraticollis.
