= Heteronyx quadraticollis =

Scientific classification
- Kingdom: Animalia
- Phylum: Arthropoda
- Clade: Pancrustacea
- Class: Insecta
- Order: Coleoptera
- Suborder: Polyphaga
- Infraorder: Scarabaeiformia
- Family: Scarabaeidae
- Genus: Heteronyx
- Species: H. quadraticollis

Binomial name
- Heteronyx quadraticollis Blackburn, 1890

Species of beetle

Heteronyx quadraticollis is a species of beetle of the family Scarabaeidae. It is found in Australia (South Australia, Tasmania).

== Description ==
Adults reach a length of about 8–10 mm (0.31–0.39 in). They are castaneous, with semi-erect, setae on the disc of both the pronotum and elytra. The pronotum and elytra are shining.
