= Heteronyx agricola =

Scientific classification
- Kingdom: Animalia
- Phylum: Arthropoda
- Clade: Pancrustacea
- Class: Insecta
- Order: Coleoptera
- Suborder: Polyphaga
- Infraorder: Scarabaeiformia
- Family: Scarabaeidae
- Genus: Heteronyx
- Species: H. agricola

Binomial name
- Heteronyx agricola Blackburn, 1910

Species of beetle

Heteronyx agricola is a species of beetle of the family Scarabaeidae. It is found in Australia (New South Wales, Victoria).

== Description ==
Adults reach a length of about 9–11 mm (0.35–0.43 in). They are similar to Heteronyx sloanei, but may be distinguished by the shape of the labrum and the form of the parameres.
