= Heteronyx glabratus =

Scientific classification
- Kingdom: Animalia
- Phylum: Arthropoda
- Clade: Pancrustacea
- Class: Insecta
- Order: Coleoptera
- Suborder: Polyphaga
- Infraorder: Scarabaeiformia
- Family: Scarabaeidae
- Genus: Heteronyx
- Species: H. glabratus

Binomial name
- Heteronyx glabratus (Erichson, 1842)

Synonyms
- Silopa glabrata Erichson, 1842

Species of beetle

Heteronyx glabratus is a species of beetle of the family Scarabaeidae. It is found in Australia (Tasmania).

== Description ==
Adults reach a length of about 8–11 mm (0.31–0.43 in). They are very similar to Heteronyx sloanei, but may be distinguished by the less transverse pronotum, the elytra without a pale, membranous apical margin and the shape of the aedeagus.
