= Heteronyx sloanei =

Scientific classification
- Kingdom: Animalia
- Phylum: Arthropoda
- Clade: Pancrustacea
- Class: Insecta
- Order: Coleoptera
- Suborder: Polyphaga
- Infraorder: Scarabaeiformia
- Family: Scarabaeidae
- Genus: Heteronyx
- Species: H. sloanei

Binomial name
- Heteronyx sloanei Blackburn, 1889

Species of beetle

Heteronyx sloanei is a species of beetle of the family Scarabaeidae. It is found in Australia (Australian Capital Territory, Victoria).

== Description ==
Adults reach a length of about 8–9.5 mm (0.31–0.37 in). They are very similar to Heteronyx glabratus, but may be distinguished by the more transverse pronotum and the pale, membranous apical margins of the elytra.
