= Heteronyx blandus =

Scientific classification
- Kingdom: Animalia
- Phylum: Arthropoda
- Clade: Pancrustacea
- Class: Insecta
- Order: Coleoptera
- Suborder: Polyphaga
- Infraorder: Scarabaeiformia
- Family: Scarabaeidae
- Genus: Heteronyx
- Species: H. blandus

Binomial name
- Heteronyx blandus Blackburn, 1909

Species of beetle

Heteronyx blandus is a species of beetle of the family Scarabaeidae. It is found in Australia (South Australia).

== Description ==
Adults reach a length of about 3.5–5.5 mm (0.14–0.22 in). They have a yellowish brown body. They are similar to Heteronyx granum, but may be distinguished by the dense fringe of pale scales on the posterior edge of the propygidium, the less dense punctuation on the pronotum and the shape of the parameres.
