= Heteronyx granum =

Scientific classification
- Kingdom: Animalia
- Phylum: Arthropoda
- Clade: Pancrustacea
- Class: Insecta
- Order: Coleoptera
- Suborder: Polyphaga
- Infraorder: Scarabaeiformia
- Family: Scarabaeidae
- Genus: Heteronyx
- Species: H. granum

Binomial name
- Heteronyx granum Burmeister, 1855

Species of beetle

Heteronyx granum is a species of beetle of the family Scarabaeidae. It is found in Australia (Tasmania, South Australia, New South Wales, Australian Capital Territory).

== Description ==
Adults reach a length of about 4–5 mm (0.16–0.20 in). They are similar to Heteronyx blandus, but may be distinguished by the claws, the absence of a dense fringe of short setae on the posterior edge of the propygidium, the longer setae on the disc of the pronotum and the shape of the parameres.
