= Heteronyx marcidus =

Scientific classification
- Kingdom: Animalia
- Phylum: Arthropoda
- Clade: Pancrustacea
- Class: Insecta
- Order: Coleoptera
- Suborder: Polyphaga
- Infraorder: Scarabaeiformia
- Family: Scarabaeidae
- Genus: Heteronyx
- Species: H. marcidus

Binomial name
- Heteronyx marcidus Blackburn, 1892

Species of beetle

Heteronyx marcidus is a species of beetle of the family Scarabaeidae. It is found in Australia (South Australia, Victoria).

== Description ==
Adults reach a length of about 10 mm (0.39 in). They are similar to Heteronyx constans, but may be distinguished by the shape of the aedeagus and slightly denser punctuation on the pronotum and elytra.
