= Heteronyx constans =

Scientific classification
- Kingdom: Animalia
- Phylum: Arthropoda
- Clade: Pancrustacea
- Class: Insecta
- Order: Coleoptera
- Suborder: Polyphaga
- Infraorder: Scarabaeiformia
- Family: Scarabaeidae
- Genus: Heteronyx
- Species: H. constans

Binomial name
- Heteronyx constans Blackburn, 1889

Synonyms
- Heteronyx yilgarnensis Blackburn, 1890

Species of beetle

Heteronyx constans is a species of beetle of the family Scarabaeidae. It is found in Australia (South Australia, New South Wales, Victoria, Western Australia, Australian Capital Territory).

== Description ==
Adults reach a length of about 14 mm (0.55 in). They are piceous, except for the dark reddish lateral margins of the clypeus. The propygidium is densely punctured, with the punctures bearing tiny pale scales.
