= Heteronyx aspericollis =

Scientific classification
- Kingdom: Animalia
- Phylum: Arthropoda
- Clade: Pancrustacea
- Class: Insecta
- Order: Coleoptera
- Suborder: Polyphaga
- Infraorder: Scarabaeiformia
- Family: Scarabaeidae
- Genus: Heteronyx
- Species: H. aspericollis

Binomial name
- Heteronyx aspericollis Blackburn, 1889

Species of beetle

Heteronyx aspericollis is a species of beetle of the family Scarabaeidae. It is found in Australia (New South Wales).

== Description ==
Adults reach a length of about 4.5–5.5 mm (0.18–0.22 in). They are similar to Heteronyx hirtuosus.
