= Heteronyx hirtuosus =

Scientific classification
- Kingdom: Animalia
- Phylum: Arthropoda
- Clade: Pancrustacea
- Class: Insecta
- Order: Coleoptera
- Suborder: Polyphaga
- Infraorder: Scarabaeiformia
- Family: Scarabaeidae
- Genus: Heteronyx
- Species: H. hirtuosus

Binomial name
- Heteronyx hirtuosus Blackburn, 1890

Species of beetle

Heteronyx hirtuosus is a species of beetle of the family Scarabaeidae. It is found in Australia (South Australia, Victoria, Tasmania).

== Description ==
Adults reach a length of about 4.5–6 mm (0.18–0.24 in). The dorsal surface of the head, pronotum, scutellum and the ventral surface of the thorax are piceous or black. The basal half of the elytra is black, while the rest is pale reddish. Sometimes the elytra are completely dark brown. The abdomen and legs are yellowish brown.
