= Heteronyx metropolitanus =

Scientific classification
- Kingdom: Animalia
- Phylum: Arthropoda
- Clade: Pancrustacea
- Class: Insecta
- Order: Coleoptera
- Suborder: Polyphaga
- Infraorder: Scarabaeiformia
- Family: Scarabaeidae
- Genus: Heteronyx
- Species: H. metropolitanus

Binomial name
- Heteronyx metropolitanus Blackburn, 1909

Species of beetle

Heteronyx metropolitanus is a species of beetle of the family Scarabaeidae. It is found in Australia (New South Wales).

== Description ==
Adults reach a length of about 5.5–6 mm (0.22–0.24 in). They are pale yellowish brown and very similar to Heteronyx simplicicollis, but may be distinguished by the uniformly curved edge of the clypeus, the more transverse pronotum and the shape of the parameres.
