= Heteronyx simplicicollis =

Scientific classification
- Kingdom: Animalia
- Phylum: Arthropoda
- Clade: Pancrustacea
- Class: Insecta
- Order: Coleoptera
- Suborder: Polyphaga
- Infraorder: Scarabaeiformia
- Family: Scarabaeidae
- Genus: Heteronyx
- Species: H. simplicicollis

Binomial name
- Heteronyx simplicicollis Blackburn, 1909

Species of beetle

Heteronyx simplicicollis is a species of beetle of the family Scarabaeidae. It is found in Australia (New South Wales, Australian Capital Territory, Victoria).

== Description ==
Adults reach a length of about 5–6 mm (0.20–0.24 in). They are similar to Heteronyx metropolitanus.
