= Heteronyx agrestis =

Scientific classification
- Kingdom: Animalia
- Phylum: Arthropoda
- Clade: Pancrustacea
- Class: Insecta
- Order: Coleoptera
- Suborder: Polyphaga
- Infraorder: Scarabaeiformia
- Family: Scarabaeidae
- Genus: Heteronyx
- Species: H. agrestis

Binomial name
- Heteronyx agrestis Burmeister, 1855

Species of beetle

Heteronyx agrestis is a species of beetle of the family Scarabaeidae. It is found in Australia (Western Australia).

== Description ==
Adults reach a length of about 11–15 mm (0.43–0.59 in). They are similar to Heteronyx proxima and Heteronyx pustulo, but may be distinguished by the shape of the aedeagus.
