= Heteronyx proxima =

Scientific classification
- Kingdom: Animalia
- Phylum: Arthropoda
- Clade: Pancrustacea
- Class: Insecta
- Order: Coleoptera
- Suborder: Polyphaga
- Infraorder: Scarabaeiformia
- Family: Scarabaeidae
- Genus: Heteronyx
- Species: H. proxima

Binomial name
- Heteronyx proxima Burmeister, 1855

Species of beetle

Heteronyx proxima is a species of beetle of the family Scarabaeidae. It is found in Australia (Western Australia).

== Description ==
Adults reach a length of about 9–13 mm (0.35–0.51 in). They are dark castaneous and the dorsal surface is uniformly clothed with short, pale setae. There are some long, yellowish setae on the clypeus, frons, anterior margin of the pronotum and the base of the elytra.
