= Heteronyx perkinsi =

Scientific classification
- Kingdom: Animalia
- Phylum: Arthropoda
- Clade: Pancrustacea
- Class: Insecta
- Order: Coleoptera
- Suborder: Polyphaga
- Infraorder: Scarabaeiformia
- Family: Scarabaeidae
- Genus: Heteronyx
- Species: H. perkinsi

Binomial name
- Heteronyx perkinsi Blackburn, 1909

Species of beetle

Heteronyx perkinsi is a species of beetle of the family Scarabaeidae. It is found in Australia (Queensland).

== Description ==
Adults reach a length of about 9 mm (0.35 in). They are very similar to Heteronyx unicus. The head and pronotum are pale castaneous. There are setae on the pronotum and elytra.
