= Heteronyx unicus =

Scientific classification
- Kingdom: Animalia
- Phylum: Arthropoda
- Clade: Pancrustacea
- Class: Insecta
- Order: Coleoptera
- Suborder: Polyphaga
- Infraorder: Scarabaeiformia
- Family: Scarabaeidae
- Genus: Heteronyx
- Species: H. unicus

Binomial name
- Heteronyx unicus Blackburn, 1900

Species of beetle

Heteronyx unicus is a species of beetle of the family Scarabaeidae. It is found in Australia (South Australia, Queensland).

== Description ==
Adults reach a length of about 9 mm (0.35 in). The head is pale castaneous, while the elytra, pronotum, ventral surface and legs are pale, yellowish brown.
