= Heteronyx apertus =

Scientific classification
- Kingdom: Animalia
- Phylum: Arthropoda
- Clade: Pancrustacea
- Class: Insecta
- Order: Coleoptera
- Suborder: Polyphaga
- Infraorder: Scarabaeiformia
- Family: Scarabaeidae
- Genus: Heteronyx
- Species: H. apertus

Binomial name
- Heteronyx apertus Blackburn, 1910

Species of beetle

Heteronyx apertus is a species of beetle of the family Scarabaeidae. It is found in Australia (Western Australia).

== Description ==
Adults reach a length of about 8–10 mm (0.31–0.39 in). They are very similar to Heteronyx fervidus.
