= Heteronyx fervidus =

Scientific classification
- Kingdom: Animalia
- Phylum: Arthropoda
- Clade: Pancrustacea
- Class: Insecta
- Order: Coleoptera
- Suborder: Polyphaga
- Infraorder: Scarabaeiformia
- Family: Scarabaeidae
- Genus: Heteronyx
- Species: H. fervidus

Binomial name
- Heteronyx fervidus Blackburn, 1892

Species of beetle

Heteronyx fervidus is a species of beetle of the family Scarabaeidae. It is found in Australia (Western Australia).

== Description ==
Adults reach a length of about 10–12 mm (0.39–0.47 in). The clypeus and frons are coarsely and very densely punctured, while the elytra have sparse, erect setae. They are very similar to 'Heteronyx apertus.
