= Heteronyx pallidulus =

Scientific classification
- Kingdom: Animalia
- Phylum: Arthropoda
- Clade: Pancrustacea
- Class: Insecta
- Order: Coleoptera
- Suborder: Polyphaga
- Infraorder: Scarabaeiformia
- Family: Scarabaeidae
- Genus: Heteronyx
- Species: H. pallidulus

Binomial name
- Heteronyx pallidulus MacLeay, 1871

Species of beetle

Heteronyx pallidulus is a species of beetle of the family Scarabaeidae. It is found in Australia (Queensland).

== Description ==
Adults reach a length of about 5–6.5 mm (0.20–0.26 in). They are very similar to Heteronyx viduus, but may be distinguished by the absence of a prosternal spine and the more strongly punctured pronotum.
