= Heteronyx simius =

Scientific classification
- Kingdom: Animalia
- Phylum: Arthropoda
- Clade: Pancrustacea
- Class: Insecta
- Order: Coleoptera
- Suborder: Polyphaga
- Infraorder: Scarabaeiformia
- Family: Scarabaeidae
- Genus: Heteronyx
- Species: H. simius

Binomial name
- Heteronyx simius Blackburn, 1890

Species of beetle

Heteronyx simius is a species of beetle of the family Scarabaeidae. It is found in Australia (New South Wales, Australian Capital Territory, Victoria).

== Description ==
Adults reach a length of about 7–8.5 mm (0.28–0.33 in). They are similar to Heteronyx ovatus, but larger, with denser punctuation and the pronotum without a fine basal margin.
