= Heteronyx torvus =

Scientific classification
- Kingdom: Animalia
- Phylum: Arthropoda
- Clade: Pancrustacea
- Class: Insecta
- Order: Coleoptera
- Suborder: Polyphaga
- Infraorder: Scarabaeiformia
- Family: Scarabaeidae
- Genus: Heteronyx
- Species: H. torvus

Binomial name
- Heteronyx torvus Blackburn, 1888

Species of beetle

Heteronyx torvus is a species of beetle of the family Scarabaeidae. It is found in Australia (South Australia, Victoria).

== Description ==
Adults reach a length of about 10–14 mm (0.39–0.55 in). The dorsal surface is black, while the ventral surface and legs are piceous and the antennae reddish brown.
