= Heteronyx frenchi =

Scientific classification
- Kingdom: Animalia
- Phylum: Arthropoda
- Clade: Pancrustacea
- Class: Insecta
- Order: Coleoptera
- Suborder: Polyphaga
- Infraorder: Scarabaeiformia
- Family: Scarabaeidae
- Genus: Heteronyx
- Species: H. frenchi

Binomial name
- Heteronyx frenchi Blackburn, 1909

Species of beetle

Heteronyx frenchi is a species of beetle of the family Scarabaeidae. It is found in Australia (Western Australia).

== Description ==
Adults reach a length of about 6.5 mm (0.26 in). They are castaneous. The dorsal surface is shining and the pygidium has long setae.
