= Colpochila fulva =

Scientific classification
- Kingdom: Animalia
- Phylum: Arthropoda
- Clade: Pancrustacea
- Class: Insecta
- Order: Coleoptera
- Suborder: Polyphaga
- Infraorder: Scarabaeiformia
- Family: Scarabaeidae
- Genus: Colpochila
- Species: C. fulva

Binomial name
- Colpochila fulva Britton, 1986

Species of beetle

Colpochila fulva is a species of beetle of the family Scarabaeidae. It is found in Australia (Queensland).

== Description ==
Adults reach a length of about 12.5 mm (0.49 in). They are very similar to Colpochila nana and Colpochila lutea. The pronotum is iridescent and reddish, while the elytra are iridescent and yellowish brown.
