= Colpochila nigra =

Scientific classification
- Kingdom: Animalia
- Phylum: Arthropoda
- Clade: Pancrustacea
- Class: Insecta
- Order: Coleoptera
- Suborder: Polyphaga
- Infraorder: Scarabaeiformia
- Family: Scarabaeidae
- Genus: Colpochila
- Species: C. nigra

Binomial name
- Colpochila nigra (Lea, 1919)

Synonyms
- Haplonycha nigra Lea, 1919

Species of beetle

Colpochila nigra is a species of beetle of the family Scarabaeidae. It is found in Australia (Western Australia).

== Description ==
Adults reach a length of about 18.5 mm (0.73 in). The pronotum and elytra are almost black. They are similar to Colpochila nitens and Colpochila nigromarginata, but may be distinguished by the shape of the clypeus and the coarse punctures on the head, pronotum, elytra and pygidium.
