= Colpochila affinis =

Scientific classification
- Kingdom: Animalia
- Phylum: Arthropoda
- Clade: Pancrustacea
- Class: Insecta
- Order: Coleoptera
- Suborder: Polyphaga
- Infraorder: Scarabaeiformia
- Family: Scarabaeidae
- Genus: Colpochila
- Species: C. affinis

Binomial name
- Colpochila affinis Britton, 1986

Species of beetle

Colpochila affinis is a species of beetle of the family Scarabaeidae. It is found in Australia (Northern Territory).

== Description ==
Adults reach a length of about 14 mm (0.55 in). They are similar to Colpochila pinguis and Colpochila nana, but may be distinguished by the 8-segmented antennae with a 4-lamellate club. The pronotum is shining and reddish, while the elytra are shining and reddish to yellowish brown.
