= Colpochila callida =

Scientific classification
- Kingdom: Animalia
- Phylum: Arthropoda
- Clade: Pancrustacea
- Class: Insecta
- Order: Coleoptera
- Suborder: Polyphaga
- Infraorder: Scarabaeiformia
- Family: Scarabaeidae
- Genus: Colpochila
- Species: C. callida

Binomial name
- Colpochila callida Britton, 1986

Species of beetle

Colpochila callida is a species of beetle of the family Scarabaeidae. It is found in Australia (Western Australia, Northern Territory).

== Description ==
Adults reach a length of about 12–16 mm (0.47–0.63 in). They are very similar to Colpochila spadix, but may be distinguished by the more semicircular clypeus and the shape of the aedeagus. The pronotum is shining and reddish, while the elytra are shining and yellowish brown.
