= Colpochila funerea =

Scientific classification
- Kingdom: Animalia
- Phylum: Arthropoda
- Clade: Pancrustacea
- Class: Insecta
- Order: Coleoptera
- Suborder: Polyphaga
- Infraorder: Scarabaeiformia
- Family: Scarabaeidae
- Genus: Colpochila
- Species: C. funerea

Binomial name
- Colpochila funerea Blackburn, 1890

Species of beetle

Colpochila funerea is a species of beetle of the family Scarabaeidae. It is found in Australia (South Australia).

== Description ==
Adults reach a length of about 16–18 mm (0.63–0.71 in). They are very similar to Colpochila nigromarginata. The dorsal surface is shining and black and they have an apical fringe of long setae on the elytra.
