= Colpochila sorella =

Scientific classification
- Kingdom: Animalia
- Phylum: Arthropoda
- Clade: Pancrustacea
- Class: Insecta
- Order: Coleoptera
- Suborder: Polyphaga
- Infraorder: Scarabaeiformia
- Family: Scarabaeidae
- Genus: Colpochila
- Species: C. sorella

Binomial name
- Colpochila sorella Britton, 1986

Species of beetle

Colpochila sorella is a species of beetle of the family Scarabaeidae. It is found in Australia (Western Australia).

== Description ==
Adults reach a length of about 25–28 mm (0.98–1.10 in). They are similar to Colpochila laminata, but may be distinguished by the reddish head and pronotum and pale elytra, as well as by the setae on the posterior and (usually also) the anterior margin of the pronotum.
