= Colpochila melina =

Scientific classification
- Kingdom: Animalia
- Phylum: Arthropoda
- Clade: Pancrustacea
- Class: Insecta
- Order: Coleoptera
- Suborder: Polyphaga
- Infraorder: Scarabaeiformia
- Family: Scarabaeidae
- Genus: Colpochila
- Species: C. melina

Binomial name
- Colpochila melina Britton, 1986

Species of beetle

Colpochila melina is a species of beetle of the family Scarabaeidae. It is found in Australia (Western Australia).

== Description ==
Adults reach a length of about 17–20 mm (0.67–0.79 in). They are very similar to Colpochila ruficeps. The pronotum is dull and yellowish brown. while the elytra are shining and yellowish brown.
