= Colpochila setifera =

Scientific classification
- Kingdom: Animalia
- Phylum: Arthropoda
- Clade: Pancrustacea
- Class: Insecta
- Order: Coleoptera
- Suborder: Polyphaga
- Infraorder: Scarabaeiformia
- Family: Scarabaeidae
- Genus: Colpochila
- Species: C. setifera

Binomial name
- Colpochila setifera Britton, 1986

Species of beetle

Colpochila setifera is a species of beetle of the family Scarabaeidae. It is found in Australia (Western Australia).

== Description ==
Adults reach a length of about 21–22 mm (0.83–0.87 in). The pronotum is dull and reddish or yellowish brown, while the elytra are dull and reddish. They are similar to Colpochila gouldii, but may be distinguished by the numerous long setae along the posterior margin of the pronotum, as well as the shape of the clypeus and the aedeagus.
