= Colpochila nobilis =

Scientific classification
- Kingdom: Animalia
- Phylum: Arthropoda
- Clade: Pancrustacea
- Class: Insecta
- Order: Coleoptera
- Suborder: Polyphaga
- Infraorder: Scarabaeiformia
- Family: Scarabaeidae
- Genus: Colpochila
- Species: C. nobilis

Binomial name
- Colpochila nobilis (Blackburn, 1906)

Synonyms
- Haplonycha nobilis Blackburn, 1906; Haplonycha colossa Lea, 1919; Haplonycha lucifera Blackburn, 1906

Species of beetle

Colpochila nobilis is a species of beetle of the family Scarabaeidae. It is found in Australia (Western Australia).

== Description ==
Adults reach a length of about 24–33 mm (0.94–1.30 in). The pronotum is shining and reddish, while the elytra are shining and reddish or yellowish brown. They are similar to Colpochila gigantea, but only have a few short setae near the base of the pygidium and the shape of the aedeagus is different.
