= Colpochila velata =

Scientific classification
- Kingdom: Animalia
- Phylum: Arthropoda
- Clade: Pancrustacea
- Class: Insecta
- Order: Coleoptera
- Suborder: Polyphaga
- Infraorder: Scarabaeiformia
- Family: Scarabaeidae
- Genus: Colpochila
- Species: C. velata

Binomial name
- Colpochila velata Britton, 1986

Species of beetle

Colpochila velata is a species of beetle of the family Scarabaeidae. It is found in Australia (New South Wales, Queensland).

== Description ==
Adults reach a length of about 23–28 mm (0.91–1.10 in). The pronotum is shining and reddish, while the elytra are shining and reddish or yellowish brown. They are similar to Colpochila major, but may be distinguished by the presence of setae on the frons and the shape of the aedeagus.
