= Colpochila fortis =

Scientific classification
- Kingdom: Animalia
- Phylum: Arthropoda
- Clade: Pancrustacea
- Class: Insecta
- Order: Coleoptera
- Suborder: Polyphaga
- Infraorder: Scarabaeiformia
- Family: Scarabaeidae
- Genus: Colpochila
- Species: C. fortis

Binomial name
- Colpochila fortis Blackburn, 1890

Synonyms
- Colpochila campestris Blackburn, 1892

Species of beetle

Colpochila fortis is a species of beetle of the family Scarabaeidae. It is found in Australia (South Australia, Western Australia).

== Description ==
Adults reach a length of about 21–25 mm (0.83–0.98 in). They are very similar to Colpochila laminata, but may be distinguished by the dull dorsal surface and the form of the aedeagus.
