= Colpochila clypealis =

Scientific classification
- Kingdom: Animalia
- Phylum: Arthropoda
- Clade: Pancrustacea
- Class: Insecta
- Order: Coleoptera
- Suborder: Polyphaga
- Infraorder: Scarabaeiformia
- Family: Scarabaeidae
- Genus: Colpochila
- Species: C. clypealis

Binomial name
- Colpochila clypealis (Blackburn, 1906)

Synonyms
- Haplonycha clypealis Blackburn, 1906; Haplonycha marginipennis Lea, 1919

Species of beetle

Colpochila clypealis is a species of beetle of the family Scarabaeidae. It is found in Australia (Western Australia).

== Description ==
Adults reach a length of about 19–22 mm (0.75–0.87 in). The pronotum is shining, iridescent and reddish, while the elytra are iridescent and reddish. They are similar to Colpochila villosa, but may be distinguished by the absence of long setae on the disc of the elytra, the longer apical elytral fringe, and the different shape of the aedeagus.
