= Colpochila blackburni =

Scientific classification
- Kingdom: Animalia
- Phylum: Arthropoda
- Clade: Pancrustacea
- Class: Insecta
- Order: Coleoptera
- Suborder: Polyphaga
- Infraorder: Scarabaeiformia
- Family: Scarabaeidae
- Genus: Colpochila
- Species: C. blackburni

Binomial name
- Colpochila blackburni Britton, 1986

Species of beetle

Colpochila blackburni is a species of beetle of the family Scarabaeidae. It is found in Australia (Western Australia).

== Description ==
Adults reach a length of about 27–28 mm (1.1–1.1 in). They are very similar to Colpochila soror. The pronotum is shining and reddish, while the elytra are dull and yellowish brown.
