= Colpochila secreta =

Scientific classification
- Kingdom: Animalia
- Phylum: Arthropoda
- Clade: Pancrustacea
- Class: Insecta
- Order: Coleoptera
- Suborder: Polyphaga
- Infraorder: Scarabaeiformia
- Family: Scarabaeidae
- Genus: Colpochila
- Species: C. secreta

Binomial name
- Colpochila secreta Britton, 1986

Species of beetle

Colpochila secreta is a species of beetle of the family Scarabaeidae. It is found in Australia (Northern Territory, Queensland).

== Description ==
Adults reach a length of about 25–29 mm (0.98–1.14 in). The pronotum is shining, iridescent and reddish, while the elytra are iridescent, dull and yellowish brown. They are similar to Colpochila gouldii, but may be distinguished by the shape of the aedeagus and the setae on the posterior margin of the pronotum.
