= Colpochila arida =

Scientific classification
- Kingdom: Animalia
- Phylum: Arthropoda
- Clade: Pancrustacea
- Class: Insecta
- Order: Coleoptera
- Suborder: Polyphaga
- Infraorder: Scarabaeiformia
- Family: Scarabaeidae
- Genus: Colpochila
- Species: C. arida

Binomial name
- Colpochila arida Britton, 1986

Species of beetle

Colpochila arida is a species of beetle of the family Scarabaeidae. It is found in Australia (Western Australia, South Australia).

== Description ==
Adults reach a length of about 16–20 mm (0.63–0.79 in). They are very similar to Colpochila maura, but may be distinguished by the dense fringe of setae on the apices of the elytra, and by the presence of setae on the posterior margin of the pronotum.
