= Colpochila antennalis =

Scientific classification
- Kingdom: Animalia
- Phylum: Arthropoda
- Clade: Pancrustacea
- Class: Insecta
- Order: Coleoptera
- Suborder: Polyphaga
- Infraorder: Scarabaeiformia
- Family: Scarabaeidae
- Genus: Colpochila
- Species: C. antennalis

Binomial name
- Colpochila antennalis (Blackburn, 1906)

Synonyms
- Haplonycha antennalis Blackburn, 1906

Species of beetle

Colpochila antennalis is a species of beetle of the family Scarabaeidae. It is found in Australia (Western Australia).

== Description ==
Adults reach a length of about 25–29 mm (0.98–1.14 in). They are very similar to Colpochila laminata, but may be distinguished the shape of the aedeagus, the longer antennal club, and the less obvious punctuation of the pronotum and pygidium. The pronotum is shining and black, while the elytra are shining and reddish to yellowish brown.
