= Colpochila vicina =

Scientific classification
- Kingdom: Animalia
- Phylum: Arthropoda
- Clade: Pancrustacea
- Class: Insecta
- Order: Coleoptera
- Suborder: Polyphaga
- Infraorder: Scarabaeiformia
- Family: Scarabaeidae
- Genus: Colpochila
- Species: C. vicina

Binomial name
- Colpochila vicina Britton, 1986

Species of beetle

Colpochila vicina is a species of beetle of the family Scarabaeidae. It is found in Australia (Western Australia).

== Description ==
Adults reach a length of about 24–28 mm (0.94–1.10 in). The pronotum is shining and reddish, while the elytra are shining and yellowish brown. They are similar to Colpochila polita, but may be distinguished by the shorter setae on the pygidium and the shape of the aedeagus.
