= Colpochila accepta =

Scientific classification
- Kingdom: Animalia
- Phylum: Arthropoda
- Clade: Pancrustacea
- Class: Insecta
- Order: Coleoptera
- Suborder: Polyphaga
- Infraorder: Scarabaeiformia
- Family: Scarabaeidae
- Genus: Colpochila
- Species: C. accepta

Binomial name
- Colpochila accepta (Blackburn, 1906)

Synonyms
- Haplonycha accepta Blackburn, 1906

Species of beetle

Colpochila accepta is a species of beetle of the family Scarabaeidae. It is found in Australia (Western Australia).

== Description ==
Adults reach a length of about 17–20 mm (0.67–0.79 in). They are similar to Colpochila iris, but may be distinguished by the paler reddish colour and the lack of iridescence on the pronotum and elytra.
