= Colpochila bimucronata =

Scientific classification
- Kingdom: Animalia
- Phylum: Arthropoda
- Clade: Pancrustacea
- Class: Insecta
- Order: Coleoptera
- Suborder: Polyphaga
- Infraorder: Scarabaeiformia
- Family: Scarabaeidae
- Genus: Colpochila
- Species: C. bimucronata

Binomial name
- Colpochila bimucronata (Lea, 1917)

Synonyms
- Haplonycha bimucronata Lea, 1917

Species of beetle

Colpochila bimucronata is a species of beetle of the family Scarabaeidae. It is found in Australia (South Australia).

== Description ==
Adults reach a length of about 19 mm (0.75 in). Both the pronotum and elytra are iridescent and reddish. They are similar to Colpochila pulchella, but may be distinguished by the absence of setae on the disc of the pygidium.
