= Colpochila bogania =

Scientific classification
- Kingdom: Animalia
- Phylum: Arthropoda
- Clade: Pancrustacea
- Class: Insecta
- Order: Coleoptera
- Suborder: Polyphaga
- Infraorder: Scarabaeiformia
- Family: Scarabaeidae
- Genus: Colpochila
- Species: C. bogania

Binomial name
- Colpochila bogania Britton, 1986

Species of beetle

Colpochila bogania is a species of beetle of the family Scarabaeidae. It is found in Australia (Queensland, New South Wales).

== Description ==
Adults reach a length of about 13–15 mm (0.51–0.59 in). They are very similar to Colpochila paula, but may be distinguished by its larger size, less rounded posterior angles of the pronotum and the shape of the aedeagus.
