= Colpochila brevisetosa =

Scientific classification
- Kingdom: Animalia
- Phylum: Arthropoda
- Clade: Pancrustacea
- Class: Insecta
- Order: Coleoptera
- Suborder: Polyphaga
- Infraorder: Scarabaeiformia
- Family: Scarabaeidae
- Genus: Colpochila
- Species: C. brevisetosa

Binomial name
- Colpochila brevisetosa (Lea, 1930)

Synonyms
- Haplonycha brevisetosa Lea, 1930; Colpochila laciniata Britton, 1959

Species of beetle

Colpochila brevisetosa is a species of beetle of the family Scarabaeidae. It is found in Australia (Queensland, South Australia, Western Australia).

== Description ==
Adults reach a length of about 19–24 mm (0.75–0.94 in). They are similar to Colpochila solida and Colpochila firma. All these species have the pygidium clothed with short, erect setae. The elytra are reddish.
