= Colpochila goerlingi =

Scientific classification
- Kingdom: Animalia
- Phylum: Arthropoda
- Clade: Pancrustacea
- Class: Insecta
- Order: Coleoptera
- Suborder: Polyphaga
- Infraorder: Scarabaeiformia
- Family: Scarabaeidae
- Genus: Colpochila
- Species: C. goerlingi

Binomial name
- Colpochila goerlingi Britton, 1986

Species of beetle

Colpochila goerlingi is a species of beetle of the family Scarabaeidae. It is found in Australia (Western Australia, Northern Territory, South Australia).

== Description ==
Adults reach a length of about 18–21 mm (0.71–0.83 in). They are uniform dark reddish brown. The elytra have erect setae within the inner apical angles. They are similar to Colpochila solida, but may be distinguished by the form of the aedeagus.
