= Colpochila freyi =

Scientific classification
- Kingdom: Animalia
- Phylum: Arthropoda
- Clade: Pancrustacea
- Class: Insecta
- Order: Coleoptera
- Suborder: Polyphaga
- Infraorder: Scarabaeiformia
- Family: Scarabaeidae
- Genus: Colpochila
- Species: C. freyi

Binomial name
- Colpochila freyi Britton, 1959

Species of beetle

Colpochila freyi is a species of beetle of the family Scarabaeidae. It is found in Australia (Western Australia).

== Description ==
Adults reach a length of about 17–18 mm (0.67–0.71 in). They are very similar to Colpochila obesa, but may be distinguished by the sparse punctuation of the pygidium and by the form of the aedeagus.
