= Colpochila deceptor =

Scientific classification
- Kingdom: Animalia
- Phylum: Arthropoda
- Clade: Pancrustacea
- Class: Insecta
- Order: Coleoptera
- Suborder: Polyphaga
- Infraorder: Scarabaeiformia
- Family: Scarabaeidae
- Genus: Colpochila
- Species: C. deceptor

Binomial name
- Colpochila deceptor Blackburn, 1890

Synonyms
- Haplonycha punctatissima Blackburn, 1906

Species of beetle

Colpochila deceptor is a species of beetle of the family Scarabaeidae. It is found in Australia (Northern Territory, Queensland, South Australia, New South Wales).

== Description ==
Adults reach a length of about 16–20 mm (0.63–0.79 in). The pronotum and the elytra are iridescent and reddish. They are similar to Colpochila solida, but may be distinguished by the absence of a longitudinal lateral line separating two distinct surfaces (different setae) and by the form of the aedeagus.
