= Colpochila capta =

Scientific classification
- Kingdom: Animalia
- Phylum: Arthropoda
- Clade: Pancrustacea
- Class: Insecta
- Order: Coleoptera
- Suborder: Polyphaga
- Infraorder: Scarabaeiformia
- Family: Scarabaeidae
- Genus: Colpochila
- Species: C. capta

Binomial name
- Colpochila capta Britton, 1986

Species of beetle

Colpochila capta is a species of beetle of the family Scarabaeidae. It is found in Australia (Western Australia).

== Description ==
Adults reach a length of about 18 mm (0.71 in). They are very similar to Colpochila iricolor, but may be distinguished by the more transverse pronotum, the more prominent eyes and the shape of the aedeagus. The pronotum and elytra are iridescent and reddish.
