= Colpochila firma =

Scientific classification
- Kingdom: Animalia
- Phylum: Arthropoda
- Clade: Pancrustacea
- Class: Insecta
- Order: Coleoptera
- Suborder: Polyphaga
- Infraorder: Scarabaeiformia
- Family: Scarabaeidae
- Genus: Colpochila
- Species: C. firma

Binomial name
- Colpochila firma (Blackburn, 1906)

Synonyms
- Haplonycha firma Blackburn, 1906

Species of beetle

Colpochila firma is a species of beetle of the family Scarabaeidae. It is found in Australia (Western Australia).

== Description ==
Adults reach a length of about 19–22 mm (0.75–0.87 in). They are very similar to Colpochila solida and Colpochila brevisetosa. In all these species, the pygidium is clothed with short setae. They may however be distinguished by the more obvious posterior angles of the pronotum and the form of the aedeagus.
