= Colpochila punctulata =

Scientific classification
- Kingdom: Animalia
- Phylum: Arthropoda
- Clade: Pancrustacea
- Class: Insecta
- Order: Coleoptera
- Suborder: Polyphaga
- Infraorder: Scarabaeiformia
- Family: Scarabaeidae
- Genus: Colpochila
- Species: C. punctulata

Binomial name
- Colpochila punctulata Blanchard, 1850

Species of beetle

Colpochila punctulata is a species of beetle of the family Scarabaeidae. It is found in Australia (New South Wales, Victoria, Queensland).

== Description ==
Adults reach a length of about 19–25 mm (0.75–0.98 in). The pronotum is shining and reddish, while the elytra are shining and yellowish brown. The pygidium is shining and sparsely punctured, and bears sparse, erect setae.
