= Colpochila amabilis =

Scientific classification
- Kingdom: Animalia
- Phylum: Arthropoda
- Clade: Pancrustacea
- Class: Insecta
- Order: Coleoptera
- Suborder: Polyphaga
- Infraorder: Scarabaeiformia
- Family: Scarabaeidae
- Genus: Colpochila
- Species: C. amabilis

Binomial name
- Colpochila amabilis (Blackburn, 1906)

Synonyms
- Haplonycha amabilis Blackburn, 1906

Species of beetle

Colpochila amabilis is a species of beetle of the family Scarabaeidae. It is found in Australia (Western Australia).

== Description ==
Adults reach a length of about 18–22 mm (0.71–0.87 in). The pronotum is iridescent and reddish, while the elytra are iridescent and reddish to yellowish brown.
