= Colpochila clavipalpis =

Scientific classification
- Kingdom: Animalia
- Phylum: Arthropoda
- Clade: Pancrustacea
- Class: Insecta
- Order: Coleoptera
- Suborder: Polyphaga
- Infraorder: Scarabaeiformia
- Family: Scarabaeidae
- Genus: Colpochila
- Species: C. clavipalpis

Binomial name
- Colpochila clavipalpis Britton, 1986

Species of beetle

Colpochila clavipalpis is a species of beetle of the family Scarabaeidae. It is found in Australia (Western Australia).

== Description ==
Adults reach a length of about 25 mm (0.98 in). The pronotum and elytra are shining and reddish.
