= Colpochila longior =

Scientific classification
- Kingdom: Animalia
- Phylum: Arthropoda
- Clade: Pancrustacea
- Class: Insecta
- Order: Coleoptera
- Suborder: Polyphaga
- Infraorder: Scarabaeiformia
- Family: Scarabaeidae
- Genus: Colpochila
- Species: C. longior

Binomial name
- Colpochila longior (Blackburn, 1906)

Synonyms
- Haplonycha longior Blackburn, 1906; Haplonycha pallida Lea, 1924

Species of beetle

Colpochila longior is a species of beetle of the family Scarabaeidae. It is found in Australia (South Australia and possibly Western Australia).

== Description ==
Adults reach a length of about 12–16 mm (0.47–0.63 in). They are pale yellow, with the frons darker than the pronotum. There are rows of long setae on the abdominal ventrites and on the propygidium, as well as short setae on the disc of the elytra. The pygidium is without setae.
