= Colpochila =

Scientific classification
- Kingdom: Animalia
- Phylum: Arthropoda
- Clade: Pancrustacea
- Class: Insecta
- Order: Coleoptera
- Suborder: Polyphaga
- Infraorder: Scarabaeiformia
- Family: Scarabaeidae
- Subfamily: Sericoidinae
- Tribe: Liparetrini
- Genus: Colpochila; Erichson, 1843

Synonyms
- Haplonycha Blanchard, 1850; Aplonycha Dejean, 1836

Genus of beetles

Colpochila is a genus of beetles belonging to the family Scarabaeidae.

== Distribution and habitat ==
The genus is endemic to Australia and the species occur mainly in drier areas. These include areas such as open woodland, mallee, grassland, and semidesert.

== Life history ==
Adults are crepuscular or nocturnal and the males are attracted to light. Not much is known about the biology of the species, but the larvae are known to live in the soil. The larvae are thought to feed on roots and/or humus, while adults are thought to feed on foliage.

== Species ==
- Colpochila abdita Britton, 1986
- Colpochila accepta (Blackburn, 1906)
- Colpochila aequaliceps (Blackburn, 1906)
- Colpochila affinis Britton, 1986
- Colpochila amabilis (Blackburn, 1906)
- Colpochila andersoni Britton, 1986
- Colpochila antennalis (Blackburn, 1906)
- Colpochila aquila Britton, 1986
- Colpochila arida Britton, 1986
- Colpochila badia (Burmeister, 1855)
- Colpochila bella Blackburn, 1890
- Colpochila bicolor Blackburn, 1890
- Colpochila bidentipes (Lea, 1926)
- Colpochila bimucronata (Lea, 1917)
- Colpochila blackburni Britton, 1986
- Colpochila bogania Britton, 1986
- Colpochila boreas Britton, 1986
- Colpochila brevisetosa (Lea, 1930)
- Colpochila calabyi Britton, 1986
- Colpochila callida Britton, 1986
- Colpochila capta Britton, 1986
- Colpochila carinata Blackburn, 1890
- Colpochila carnabyi Britton, 1986
- Colpochila castanea Britton, 1986
- Colpochila chinnicki Britton, 1986
- Colpochila clara (Blackburn, 1906)
- Colpochila clavipalpis Britton, 1986
- Colpochila clypealis (Blackburn, 1906)
- Colpochila comma Britton, 1986
- Colpochila crassiventris Blanchard, 1850
- Colpochila crepera Britton, 1986
- Colpochila crinita (Burmeister, 1855)
- Colpochila cylindrica Szito, 1995
- Colpochila deceptor Blackburn, 1890
- Colpochila decolor Britton, 1986
- Colpochila diabolica Szito, 1995
- Colpochila dilatata (Lea, 1917)
- Colpochila efficax Britton, 1986
- Colpochila erythrocephala (Lea, 1917)
- Colpochila faceta (Blackburn, 1906)
- Colpochila firma (Blackburn, 1906)
- Colpochila flava Szito, 1995
- Colpochila fortis Blackburn, 1890
- Colpochila freyi Britton, 1959
- Colpochila fulva Britton, 1986
- Colpochila funerea Blackburn, 1890
- Colpochila gagatina (Burmeister, 1855)
- Colpochila gibbosicollis Blackburn, 1890
- Colpochila gigantea (Burmeister, 1855)
- Colpochila goerlingi Britton, 1986
- Colpochila gouldii (Hope, 1841)
- Colpochila griffithi (Blackburn, 1907)
- Colpochila ignota Britton, 1986
- Colpochila immatura (Lea, 1930)
- Colpochila infernalis Britton, 1986
- Colpochila ingens Britton, 1986
- Colpochila interocularis (Lea, 1917)
- Colpochila iota Britton, 1986
- Colpochila iricolor Britton, 1986
- Colpochila iridea (Lea, 1930)
- Colpochila iris Britton, 1986
- Colpochila jungi (Blackburn, 1906)
- Colpochila kalambi Britton, 1986
- Colpochila laminata Blackburn, 1890
- Colpochila latebricola (Blackburn, 1906)
- Colpochila leo Britton, 1986
- Colpochila limbata Britton, 1986
- Colpochila longiclava Britton, 1986
- Colpochila longior (Blackburn, 1906)
- Colpochila longipalpis (Lea, 1926)
- Colpochila lutea Britton, 1986
- Colpochila major Britton, 1986
- Colpochila manonii Szito, 1994
- Colpochila marginata (Blackburn, 1906)
- Colpochila maura Britton, 1986
- Colpochila melina Britton, 1986
- Colpochila minor Britton, 1986
- Colpochila mixta (Lea, 1917)
- Colpochila nana Britton, 1986
- Colpochila nasuta Britton, 1986
- Colpochila nigra (Lea, 1919)
- Colpochila nigromarginata Britton, 1986
- Colpochila nitens Britton, 1986
- Colpochila nitida Britton, 1986
- Colpochila nobilis (Blackburn, 1906)
- Colpochila obesa (Boisduval, 1835)
- Colpochila opaca (Lea, 1917)
- Colpochila pagana Britton, 1986
- Colpochila pallidula Britton, 1986
- Colpochila palpalis Blackburn, 1895
- Colpochila parva Britton, 1986
- Colpochila paula Britton, 1986
- Colpochila piceofulva Britton, 1986
- Colpochila picta Britton, 1986
- Colpochila pilosa (Blackburn, 1906)
- Colpochila pinguis (MacLeay, 1871)
- Colpochila polita Britton, 1986
- Colpochila potens Britton, 1986
- Colpochila pruinosa (Lea, 1930)
- Colpochila pubescens Britton, 1986
- Colpochila pulchella Blackburn, 1890
- Colpochila punctiventris Blackburn, 1890
- Colpochila punctulata Blanchard, 1850
- Colpochila pygmaea Blackburn, 1890
- Colpochila regia Britton, 1986
- Colpochila rubida Britton, 1986
- Colpochila rubiginosa Britton, 1986
- Colpochila ruficeps (Burmeister, 1855)
- Colpochila rufocastanea (Lea, 1930)
- Colpochila rutila Britton, 1986
- Colpochila satelles Britton, 1986
- Colpochila scutalis (Blanchard, 1850)
- Colpochila secreta Britton, 1986
- Colpochila setifera Britton, 1986
- Colpochila setosa Blackburn, 1890
- Colpochila sinuaticollis Blackburn, 1890
- Colpochila sodalis Britton, 1986
- Colpochila solida Blackburn, 1890
- Colpochila sorella Britton, 1986
- Colpochila soror Britton, 1986
- Colpochila spadix (Blackburn, 1906)
- Colpochila suavis (Lea, 1919)
- Colpochila tarsalis (Lea, 1924)
- Colpochila taylori Szito, 1994
- Colpochila testacea Szito, 1995
- Colpochila tindalei (Lea, 1926)
- Colpochila trichopyga (Blackburn, 1906)
- Colpochila unidens Britton, 1986
- Colpochila vanga Britton, 1986
- Colpochila velata Britton, 1986
- Colpochila vesca Britton, 1986
- Colpochila vicina Britton, 1986
- Colpochila villosa (Lea, 1917)

== Species with unclear status ==
- Colpochila astrolabei (Boisduval, 1835) (described as Melolontha astrolabei from Australia)
- Colpochila nitidicollis (Nonfried, 1891) (described as Haplonycha nitidicollis from North Australia)
