= Colpochila crinita =

Scientific classification
- Kingdom: Animalia
- Phylum: Arthropoda
- Clade: Pancrustacea
- Class: Insecta
- Order: Coleoptera
- Suborder: Polyphaga
- Infraorder: Scarabaeiformia
- Family: Scarabaeidae
- Genus: Colpochila
- Species: C. crinita

Binomial name
- Colpochila crinita (Burmeister, 1855)

Synonyms
- Haplonycha crinita Burmeister, 1855

Species of beetle

Colpochila crinita is a species of beetle of the family Scarabaeidae. It is found in Australia (Western Australia).

== Description ==
Adults reach a length of about 15–19 mm (0.59–0.75 in). The pronotum is shining and yellowish brown, while the elytra are shining and reddish, yellowish brown or dark brown.
