= Colpochila suavis =

Scientific classification
- Kingdom: Animalia
- Phylum: Arthropoda
- Clade: Pancrustacea
- Class: Insecta
- Order: Coleoptera
- Suborder: Polyphaga
- Infraorder: Scarabaeiformia
- Family: Scarabaeidae
- Genus: Colpochila
- Species: C. suavis

Binomial name
- Colpochila suavis (Lea, 1919)

Synonyms
- Haplonycha suavis Lea, 1919

Species of beetle

Colpochila suavis is a species of beetle of the family Scarabaeidae. It is found in Australia (Western Australia).

== Description ==
Adults reach a length of about 15–23 mm (0.59–0.91 in). The pronotum is dull and reddish or yellowish brown, while the elytra are shining, iridescent and yellowish brown. The frons and base of the clypeus are covered with short, erect setae and the pronotum is densely covered with short, pale setae. The elytra have similar, but even shorter and more sparse setae on the disc.
