= Colpochila sodalis =

Scientific classification
- Kingdom: Animalia
- Phylum: Arthropoda
- Clade: Pancrustacea
- Class: Insecta
- Order: Coleoptera
- Suborder: Polyphaga
- Infraorder: Scarabaeiformia
- Family: Scarabaeidae
- Genus: Colpochila
- Species: C. sodalis

Binomial name
- Colpochila sodalis Britton, 1986

Species of beetle

Colpochila sodalis is a species of beetle of the family Scarabaeidae. It is found in Australia (Queensland).

== Description ==
Adults reach a length of about 12–15 mm (0.47–0.59 in). The pronotum is shining and reddish, while the elytra are shining and yellowish brown.
