= Colpochila bidentipes =

Scientific classification
- Kingdom: Animalia
- Phylum: Arthropoda
- Clade: Pancrustacea
- Class: Insecta
- Order: Coleoptera
- Suborder: Polyphaga
- Infraorder: Scarabaeiformia
- Family: Scarabaeidae
- Genus: Colpochila
- Species: C. bidentipes

Binomial name
- Colpochila bidentipes (Lea, 1926)

Synonyms
- Haplonycha bidentipes Lea, 1926

Species of beetle

Colpochila bidentipes is a species of beetle of the family Scarabaeidae. It is found in Australia (Northern Territory).

== Description ==
Adults reach a length of about 10 mm (0.39 in). Both the pronotum and elytra are dull and yellowish brown.
