= Colpochila scutalis =

Scientific classification
- Kingdom: Animalia
- Phylum: Arthropoda
- Clade: Pancrustacea
- Class: Insecta
- Order: Coleoptera
- Suborder: Polyphaga
- Infraorder: Scarabaeiformia
- Family: Scarabaeidae
- Genus: Colpochila
- Species: C. scutalis

Binomial name
- Colpochila scutalis (Blanchard, 1850)

Synonyms
- Haplonycha scutalis Blanchard, 1850; Colpochila testaceipennis MacLeay, 1888

Species of beetle

Colpochila scutalis is a species of beetle of the family Scarabaeidae. It is found in Australia (Northern Territory, Queensland).

== Description ==
Adults reach a length of about 11–18 mm (0.43–0.71 in). The pronotum is shining and reddish, while the elytra are shining and yellowish brown.
