= Colpochila maura =

Scientific classification
- Kingdom: Animalia
- Phylum: Arthropoda
- Clade: Pancrustacea
- Class: Insecta
- Order: Coleoptera
- Suborder: Polyphaga
- Infraorder: Scarabaeiformia
- Family: Scarabaeidae
- Genus: Colpochila
- Species: C. maura

Binomial name
- Colpochila maura Britton, 1986

Species of beetle

Colpochila maura is a species of beetle of the family Scarabaeidae. It is found in Australia (Victoria, New South Wales).

== Description ==
Adults reach a length of about 14–18 mm (0.55–0.71 in). They are very similar to Colpochila obesa, but may be distinguished by the presence of setae on the anterior margin of the pronotum, the shining pygidium and the shape of the aedeagus.
