= Colpochila testacea =

Scientific classification
- Kingdom: Animalia
- Phylum: Arthropoda
- Clade: Pancrustacea
- Class: Insecta
- Order: Coleoptera
- Suborder: Polyphaga
- Infraorder: Scarabaeiformia
- Family: Scarabaeidae
- Genus: Colpochila
- Species: C. testacea

Binomial name
- Colpochila testacea Szito, 1995

Species of beetle

Colpochila testacea is a species of beetle of the family Scarabaeidae. It is found in Australia (Western Australia).

== Description ==
Adults reach a length of about 15–18 mm (0.59–0.71 in). The head is reddish brown, while the pronotum, scutellum and elytra are shining and testaceous, with the pronotum darker.

== Etymology ==
The species name is derived from Latin testacea (meaning yellowish brown) and refers to the colour of the elytra.
