= Colpochila iota =

Scientific classification
- Kingdom: Animalia
- Phylum: Arthropoda
- Clade: Pancrustacea
- Class: Insecta
- Order: Coleoptera
- Suborder: Polyphaga
- Infraorder: Scarabaeiformia
- Family: Scarabaeidae
- Genus: Colpochila
- Species: C. iota

Binomial name
- Colpochila iota Britton, 1986

Species of beetle

Colpochila iota is a species of beetle of the family Scarabaeidae. It is found in Australia (Northern Territory, Queensland, Western Australia).

== Description ==
Adults reach a length of about 11–14 mm (0.43–0.55 in). They are almost identical to Colpochila parva, but may be distinguished by the form of the aedeagus.
