= Colpochila unidens =

Scientific classification
- Kingdom: Animalia
- Phylum: Arthropoda
- Clade: Pancrustacea
- Class: Insecta
- Order: Coleoptera
- Suborder: Polyphaga
- Infraorder: Scarabaeiformia
- Family: Scarabaeidae
- Genus: Colpochila
- Species: C. unidens

Binomial name
- Colpochila unidens Britton, 1986

Species of beetle

Colpochila unidens is a species of beetle of the family Scarabaeidae. It is found in Australia (Western Australia).

== Description ==
Adults reach a length of about 14–17 mm (0.55–0.67 in). The head, pronotum and scutellum are castaneous, while the elytra are pale yellowish brown.
