= Colpochila mixta =

Scientific classification
- Kingdom: Animalia
- Phylum: Arthropoda
- Clade: Pancrustacea
- Class: Insecta
- Order: Coleoptera
- Suborder: Polyphaga
- Infraorder: Scarabaeiformia
- Family: Scarabaeidae
- Genus: Colpochila
- Species: C. mixta

Binomial name
- Colpochila mixta (Lea, 1917)

Synonyms
- Haplonycha mixta Lea, 1917

Species of beetle

Colpochila mixta is a species of beetle of the family Scarabaeidae. It is found in Australia (South Australia, New South Wales, Victoria).

== Description ==
Adults reach a length of about 19–22 mm (0.75–0.87 in). The pronotum is dull and reddish, while the elytra are dull and yellowish brown. There are erect setae on the surface of the clypeus, as well as short and pale setae on the disc of the elytra. The disc of the pygidium is clothed with erect setae.
