= Colpochila badia =

Scientific classification
- Kingdom: Animalia
- Phylum: Arthropoda
- Clade: Pancrustacea
- Class: Insecta
- Order: Coleoptera
- Suborder: Polyphaga
- Infraorder: Scarabaeiformia
- Family: Scarabaeidae
- Genus: Colpochila
- Species: C. badia

Binomial name
- Colpochila badia (Burmeister, 1855)

Synonyms
- Haplonycha badia Burmeister, 1855

Species of beetle

Colpochila badia is a species of beetle of the family Scarabaeidae. It is found in Australia (Western Australia).

== Description ==
Adults reach a length of about 20–23 mm (0.79–0.91 in). The pronotum and elytra are shining and reddish.
