= Colpochila manonii =

Scientific classification
- Kingdom: Animalia
- Phylum: Arthropoda
- Clade: Pancrustacea
- Class: Insecta
- Order: Coleoptera
- Suborder: Polyphaga
- Infraorder: Scarabaeiformia
- Family: Scarabaeidae
- Genus: Colpochila
- Species: C. manonii

Binomial name
- Colpochila manonii Szito, 1994

Species of beetle

Colpochila manonii is a species of beetle of the family Scarabaeidae. It is found in Australia (Western Australia).

== Description ==
Adults reach a length of about 15–17 mm (0.59–0.67 in). The head is dark reddish brown, while the pronotum and scutellum are reddish brown and the elytra yellowish brown, but more reddish at the base and along the margins. Both the pronotum and elytra are shining and iridescent.

== Etymology ==
The species is named for E. A. Manoni, a farmer at King River, Western Australia.
