= Colpochila satelles =

Scientific classification
- Kingdom: Animalia
- Phylum: Arthropoda
- Clade: Pancrustacea
- Class: Insecta
- Order: Coleoptera
- Suborder: Polyphaga
- Infraorder: Scarabaeiformia
- Family: Scarabaeidae
- Genus: Colpochila
- Species: C. satelles

Binomial name
- Colpochila satelles Britton, 1986

Species of beetle

Colpochila satelles is a species of beetle of the family Scarabaeidae. It is found in Australia (Western Australia).

== Description ==
Adults reach a length of about 22 mm (0.87 in). They are uniformly pale yellowish and have very prominent eyes.
