= Colpochila leo =

Scientific classification
- Kingdom: Animalia
- Phylum: Arthropoda
- Clade: Pancrustacea
- Class: Insecta
- Order: Coleoptera
- Suborder: Polyphaga
- Infraorder: Scarabaeiformia
- Family: Scarabaeidae
- Genus: Colpochila
- Species: C. leo

Binomial name
- Colpochila leo Britton, 1986

Species of beetle

Colpochila leo is a species of beetle of the family Scarabaeidae. It is found in Australia (Western Australia).

== Description ==
Adults reach a length of about 22–24 mm (0.87–0.94 in). The pronotum is shining and reddish, while the elytra are iridescent and reddish. There are yellowish setae on the frons and pronotum, extending on to the base of the elytra.
