= Colpochila decolor =

Scientific classification
- Kingdom: Animalia
- Phylum: Arthropoda
- Clade: Pancrustacea
- Class: Insecta
- Order: Coleoptera
- Suborder: Polyphaga
- Infraorder: Scarabaeiformia
- Family: Scarabaeidae
- Genus: Colpochila
- Species: C. decolor

Binomial name
- Colpochila decolor Britton, 1986

Species of beetle

Colpochila decolor is a species of beetle of the family Scarabaeidae. It is found in Australia (Queensland).

== Description ==
Adults reach a length of about 14 mm (0.55 in). The pronotum is yellowish brown and the elytra are shining and also yellowish brown.
