= Colpochila longipalpis =

Scientific classification
- Kingdom: Animalia
- Phylum: Arthropoda
- Clade: Pancrustacea
- Class: Insecta
- Order: Coleoptera
- Suborder: Polyphaga
- Infraorder: Scarabaeiformia
- Family: Scarabaeidae
- Genus: Colpochila
- Species: C. longipalpis

Binomial name
- Colpochila longipalpis (Lea, 1926)

Synonyms
- Haplonycha longipalpis Lea, 1926

Species of beetle

Colpochila longipalpis is a species of beetle of the family Scarabaeidae. It is found in Australia (Northern Territory).

== Description ==
Adults reach a length of about 27–31 mm (1.1–1.2 in). The head, pronotum and scutellum are dull and dark reddish, while the elytra are pale yellowish brown.
