= Colpochila pagana =

Scientific classification
- Kingdom: Animalia
- Phylum: Arthropoda
- Clade: Pancrustacea
- Class: Insecta
- Order: Coleoptera
- Suborder: Polyphaga
- Infraorder: Scarabaeiformia
- Family: Scarabaeidae
- Genus: Colpochila
- Species: C. pagana

Binomial name
- Colpochila pagana Britton, 1986

Species of beetle

Colpochila pagana is a species of beetle of the family Scarabaeidae. It is found in Australia (Western Australia).

== Description ==
Adults reach a length of about 29–36 mm (1.1–1.4 in). The pronotum is shining and reddish, while the elytra are shining and yellowish brown. The pygidium is shining and has some long setae on each side of a longitudinal area without setae.
