= Colpochila iris =

Scientific classification
- Kingdom: Animalia
- Phylum: Arthropoda
- Clade: Pancrustacea
- Class: Insecta
- Order: Coleoptera
- Suborder: Polyphaga
- Infraorder: Scarabaeiformia
- Family: Scarabaeidae
- Genus: Colpochila
- Species: C. iris

Binomial name
- Colpochila iris Britton, 1986

Species of beetle

Colpochila iris is a species of beetle of the family Scarabaeidae. It is found in Australia (Western Australia).

== Description ==
Adults reach a length of about 21–23 mm (0.83–0.91 in). They are similar to Colpochila punctiventris, but may be distinguished by the antennal club and the form of the aedeagus. They are dark reddish brown with a highly iridescent surface.
