= Colpochila pinguis =

Scientific classification
- Kingdom: Animalia
- Phylum: Arthropoda
- Clade: Pancrustacea
- Class: Insecta
- Order: Coleoptera
- Suborder: Polyphaga
- Infraorder: Scarabaeiformia
- Family: Scarabaeidae
- Genus: Colpochila
- Species: C. pinguis

Binomial name
- Colpochila pinguis (MacLeay, 1871)

Synonyms
- Haplonycha pinguis MacLeay, 1871

Species of beetle

Colpochila pinguis is a species of beetle of the family Scarabaeidae. It is found in Australia (Queensland, Northern Territory).

== Description ==
Adults reach a length of about 17 mm (0.67 in). The pronotum and elytra are shining and reddish. They are very similar to Colpochila obesa.
