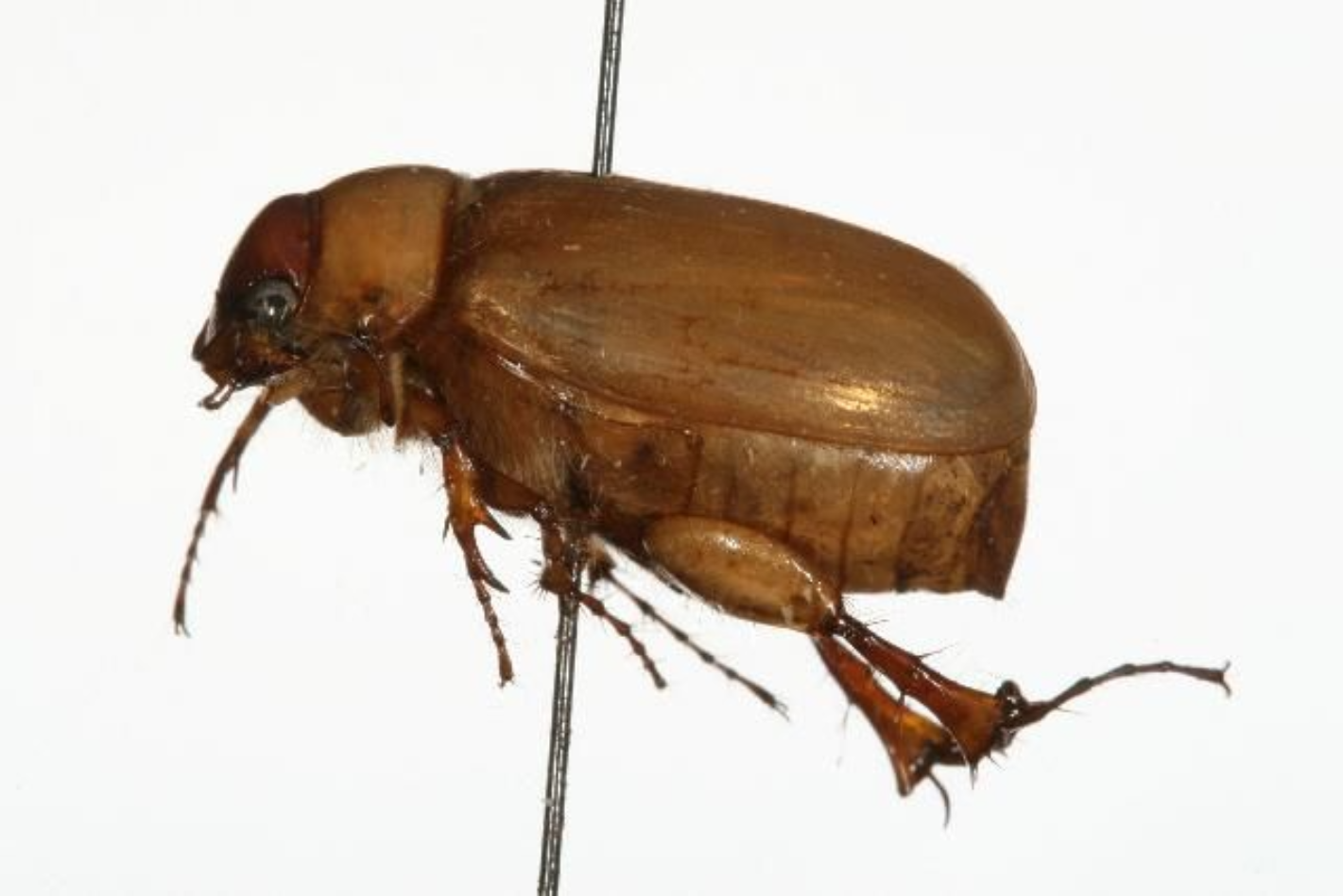

Scientific classification
- Kingdom: Animalia
- Phylum: Arthropoda
- Clade: Pancrustacea
- Class: Insecta
- Order: Coleoptera
- Suborder: Polyphaga
- Infraorder: Scarabaeiformia
- Family: Scarabaeidae
- Genus: Colpochila
- Species: C. griffithi

Binomial name
- Colpochila griffithi (Blackburn, 1907)

Synonyms
- Haplonycha griffithi Blackburn, 1907

= Colpochila griffithi =

Species of beetle

Colpochila griffithi is a species of beetle of the family Scarabaeidae. It is found in Australia (Northern Territory, Queensland).

== Description ==
Adults reach a length of about 16–20 mm (0.63–0.79 in). The surfaces of the frons and pronotum are dull and almost unpunctured. There are a few short, fine setae on the frons above the eye.
