= Colpochila regia =

Scientific classification
- Kingdom: Animalia
- Phylum: Arthropoda
- Clade: Pancrustacea
- Class: Insecta
- Order: Coleoptera
- Suborder: Polyphaga
- Infraorder: Scarabaeiformia
- Family: Scarabaeidae
- Genus: Colpochila
- Species: C. regia

Binomial name
- Colpochila regia Britton, 1986

Species of beetle

Colpochila regia is a species of beetle of the family Scarabaeidae. It is found in Australia (South Australia).

== Description ==
Adults reach a length of about 27–30 mm (1.1–1.2 in). The pronotum is shining and reddish, while the elytra are shining and yellowish brown. There is a tuft of long, erect setae on the middle of the disc of the pronotum.
