= Colpochila opaca =

Scientific classification
- Kingdom: Animalia
- Phylum: Arthropoda
- Clade: Pancrustacea
- Class: Insecta
- Order: Coleoptera
- Suborder: Polyphaga
- Infraorder: Scarabaeiformia
- Family: Scarabaeidae
- Genus: Colpochila
- Species: C. opaca

Binomial name
- Colpochila opaca (Lea, 1917)

Synonyms
- Haplonycha opaca Lea, 1917

Species of beetle

Colpochila opaca is a species of beetle of the family Scarabaeidae. It is found in Australia (South Australia, Victoria, Western Australia).

== Description ==
Adults reach a length of about 22–26 mm (0.87–1.02 in). The pronotum and the elytra are dull and reddish.
