= Colpochila aequaliceps =

Scientific classification
- Kingdom: Animalia
- Phylum: Arthropoda
- Clade: Pancrustacea
- Class: Insecta
- Order: Coleoptera
- Suborder: Polyphaga
- Infraorder: Scarabaeiformia
- Family: Scarabaeidae
- Genus: Colpochila
- Species: C. aequaliceps

Binomial name
- Colpochila aequaliceps (Blackburn, 1906)

Synonyms
- Haplonycha aequaliceps Blackburn, 1906

Species of beetle

Colpochila aequaliceps is a species of beetle of the family Scarabaeidae. It is found in Australia (Western Australia).

== Description ==
Adults reach a length of about 20 mm (0.79 in). The pronotum is shining and black, while the elytra are shining and reddish.
