= Colpochila latebricola =

Scientific classification
- Kingdom: Animalia
- Phylum: Arthropoda
- Clade: Pancrustacea
- Class: Insecta
- Order: Coleoptera
- Suborder: Polyphaga
- Infraorder: Scarabaeiformia
- Family: Scarabaeidae
- Genus: Colpochila
- Species: C. latebricola

Binomial name
- Colpochila latebricola (Blackburn, 1906)

Synonyms
- Haplonycha latebricola Blackburn, 1906

Species of beetle

Colpochila latebricola is a species of beetle of the family Scarabaeidae. It is found in Australia (Western Australia).

== Description ==
Adults reach a length of about 23–28 mm (0.91–1.10 in). The pronotum is reddish, while the elytra are yellowish brown or dark brown.
