= Colpochila kalambi =

Scientific classification
- Kingdom: Animalia
- Phylum: Arthropoda
- Clade: Pancrustacea
- Class: Insecta
- Order: Coleoptera
- Suborder: Polyphaga
- Infraorder: Scarabaeiformia
- Family: Scarabaeidae
- Genus: Colpochila
- Species: C. kalambi

Binomial name
- Colpochila kalambi Britton, 1986

Species of beetle

Colpochila kalambi is a species of beetle of the family Scarabaeidae. It is found in Australia (South Australia, Western Australia).

== Description ==
Adults reach a length of about 22–26 mm (0.87–1.02 in). The pronotum is dull and reddish, while the elytra are dull and yellowish brown.
