= Colpochila polita =

Scientific classification
- Kingdom: Animalia
- Phylum: Arthropoda
- Clade: Pancrustacea
- Class: Insecta
- Order: Coleoptera
- Suborder: Polyphaga
- Infraorder: Scarabaeiformia
- Family: Scarabaeidae
- Genus: Colpochila
- Species: C. polita

Binomial name
- Colpochila polita Britton, 1986

Species of beetle

Colpochila polita is a species of beetle of the family Scarabaeidae. It is found in Australia (South Australia, Northern Territory, Western Australia).

== Description ==
Adults reach a length of about 24–28 mm (0.94–1.10 in). The pronotum is shining and reddish, while the elytra are shining and reddish or yellowish brown. They are similar to Colpochila vanga, but that species has a more circular clypeus and setae on the disc of the pronotum.
