= Colpochila interocularis =

Scientific classification
- Kingdom: Animalia
- Phylum: Arthropoda
- Clade: Pancrustacea
- Class: Insecta
- Order: Coleoptera
- Suborder: Polyphaga
- Infraorder: Scarabaeiformia
- Family: Scarabaeidae
- Genus: Colpochila
- Species: C. interocularis

Binomial name
- Colpochila interocularis (Lea, 1917)

Synonyms
- Haplonycha interocularis Lea, 1917

Species of beetle

Colpochila interocularis is a species of beetle of the family Scarabaeidae. It is found in Australia (South Australia).

== Description ==
Adults reach a length of about 24–26 mm (0.94–1.02 in). The pronotum is dull and reddish, while the elytra are dull and yellowish brown.
