= Colpochila pallidula =

Scientific classification
- Kingdom: Animalia
- Phylum: Arthropoda
- Clade: Pancrustacea
- Class: Insecta
- Order: Coleoptera
- Suborder: Polyphaga
- Infraorder: Scarabaeiformia
- Family: Scarabaeidae
- Genus: Colpochila
- Species: C. pallidula

Binomial name
- Colpochila pallidula Britton, 1986

Species of beetle

Colpochila pallidula is a species of beetle of the family Scarabaeidae. It is found in Australia (Queensland).

== Description ==
Adults reach a length of about 15 mm (0.59 in). The pronotum, scutellum, elytra and abdomen are pale yellowish, while the head is red. The propygidium and pygidium are densely clothed with short, pale setae.
