= Colpochila cylindrica =

Scientific classification
- Kingdom: Animalia
- Phylum: Arthropoda
- Clade: Pancrustacea
- Class: Insecta
- Order: Coleoptera
- Suborder: Polyphaga
- Infraorder: Scarabaeiformia
- Family: Scarabaeidae
- Genus: Colpochila
- Species: C. cylindrica

Binomial name
- Colpochila cylindrica Szito, 1995

Species of beetle

Colpochila cylindrica is a species of beetle of the family Scarabaeidae. It is found in Australia (Western Australia).

== Description ==
Adults reach a length of about 21–22 mm (0.83–0.87 in). The head is reddish brown, while the pronotum, scutellum and elytra are castaneous, shining and iridescent.

== Etymology ==
The species name is derived from Latin and refers to the elongate shape of the body.
