= Colpochila longiclava =

Scientific classification
- Kingdom: Animalia
- Phylum: Arthropoda
- Clade: Pancrustacea
- Class: Insecta
- Order: Coleoptera
- Suborder: Polyphaga
- Infraorder: Scarabaeiformia
- Family: Scarabaeidae
- Genus: Colpochila
- Species: C. longiclava

Binomial name
- Colpochila longiclava Britton, 1986

Species of beetle

Colpochila longiclava is a species of beetle of the family Scarabaeidae. It is found in Australia (New South Wales).

== Description ==
Adults reach a length of about 15–16 mm (0.59–0.63 in). The pronotum and elytra are shining and reddish.
