= Colpochila setosa =

Scientific classification
- Kingdom: Animalia
- Phylum: Arthropoda
- Clade: Pancrustacea
- Class: Insecta
- Order: Coleoptera
- Suborder: Polyphaga
- Infraorder: Scarabaeiformia
- Family: Scarabaeidae
- Genus: Colpochila
- Species: C. setosa

Binomial name
- Colpochila setosa Blackburn, 1890

Species of beetle

Colpochila setosa is a species of beetle of the family Scarabaeidae. It is found in Australia (Northern Territory, Queensland).

== Description ==
Adults reach a length of about 14–16 mm (0.55–0.63 in). The pronotum is shining and reddish or yellowish brown, while the elytra are shining and yellowish brown.
