= Colpochila andersoni =

Scientific classification
- Kingdom: Animalia
- Phylum: Arthropoda
- Clade: Pancrustacea
- Class: Insecta
- Order: Coleoptera
- Suborder: Polyphaga
- Infraorder: Scarabaeiformia
- Family: Scarabaeidae
- Genus: Colpochila
- Species: C. andersoni

Binomial name
- Colpochila andersoni Britton, 1986

Species of beetle

Colpochila andersoni is a species of beetle of the family Scarabaeidae. It is found in Australia (Victoria, South Australia).

== Description ==
Adults reach a length of about 24–26 mm (0.94–1.02 in). The pronotum is shining, iridescent and yellowish brown, while the elytra are shining and yellowish brown.
