= Colpochila rubida =

Scientific classification
- Kingdom: Animalia
- Phylum: Arthropoda
- Clade: Pancrustacea
- Class: Insecta
- Order: Coleoptera
- Suborder: Polyphaga
- Infraorder: Scarabaeiformia
- Family: Scarabaeidae
- Genus: Colpochila
- Species: C. rubida

Binomial name
- Colpochila rubida Britton, 1986

Species of beetle

Colpochila rubida is a species of beetle of the family Scarabaeidae. It is found in Australia (Northern Territory).

== Description ==
Adults reach a length of about 18–19 mm (0.71–0.75 in). The pronotum and elytra are iridescent and reddish. There are tiny setae on the disc of the pygidium.
