= Colpochila nasuta =

Scientific classification
- Kingdom: Animalia
- Phylum: Arthropoda
- Clade: Pancrustacea
- Class: Insecta
- Order: Coleoptera
- Suborder: Polyphaga
- Infraorder: Scarabaeiformia
- Family: Scarabaeidae
- Genus: Colpochila
- Species: C. nasuta

Binomial name
- Colpochila nasuta Britton, 1986

Species of beetle

Colpochila nasuta is a species of beetle of the family Scarabaeidae. It is found in Australia (Western Australia).

== Description ==
Adults reach a length of about 19–22 mm (0.75–0.87 in). The pronotum and elytra are dull and yellowish brown.
