= Colpochila pruinosa =

Scientific classification
- Kingdom: Animalia
- Phylum: Arthropoda
- Clade: Pancrustacea
- Class: Insecta
- Order: Coleoptera
- Suborder: Polyphaga
- Infraorder: Scarabaeiformia
- Family: Scarabaeidae
- Genus: Colpochila
- Species: C. pruinosa

Binomial name
- Colpochila pruinosa (Lea, 1930)

Synonyms
- Haplonycha pruinosa Lea, 1930

Species of beetle

Colpochila pruinosa is a species of beetle of the family Scarabaeidae. It is found in Australia (Western Australia).

== Description ==
Adults reach a length of about 17 mm (0.67 in). The pronotum and elytra are shining and reddish. There are sparse, short setae on the upper part of the pygidium and the elytra have a marginal and apical fringe of pale yellowish setae.
