= Colpochila erythrocephala =

Scientific classification
- Kingdom: Animalia
- Phylum: Arthropoda
- Clade: Pancrustacea
- Class: Insecta
- Order: Coleoptera
- Suborder: Polyphaga
- Infraorder: Scarabaeiformia
- Family: Scarabaeidae
- Genus: Colpochila
- Species: C. erythrocephala

Binomial name
- Colpochila erythrocephala (Lea, 1917)

Synonyms
- Haplonycha erythrocephala Lea, 1917

Species of beetle

Colpochila erythrocephala is a species of beetle of the family Scarabaeidae. It is found in Australia (Western Australia).

== Description ==
Adults reach a length of about 18–22 mm (0.71–0.87 in). The elytra are dark brown, while the pronotum has a pattern of yellow and dark brown.
