= Colpochila marginata =

Scientific classification
- Kingdom: Animalia
- Phylum: Arthropoda
- Clade: Pancrustacea
- Class: Insecta
- Order: Coleoptera
- Suborder: Polyphaga
- Infraorder: Scarabaeiformia
- Family: Scarabaeidae
- Genus: Colpochila
- Species: C. marginata

Binomial name
- Colpochila marginata (Blackburn, 1906)

Synonyms
- Haplonycha marginata Blackburn, 1906

Species of beetle

Colpochila marginata is a species of beetle of the family Scarabaeidae. It is found in Australia (Queensland, South Australia, Western Australia).

== Description ==
Adults reach a length of about 15–18 mm (0.59–0.71 in). The pronotum and elytra are shining and yellowish brown.
