= Colpochila rufocastanea =

Scientific classification
- Kingdom: Animalia
- Phylum: Arthropoda
- Clade: Pancrustacea
- Class: Insecta
- Order: Coleoptera
- Suborder: Polyphaga
- Infraorder: Scarabaeiformia
- Family: Scarabaeidae
- Genus: Colpochila
- Species: C. rufocastanea

Binomial name
- Colpochila rufocastanea (Lea, 1930)

Synonyms
- Haplonycha rufocastanea Lea, 1930

Species of beetle

Colpochila rufocastanea is a species of beetle of the family Scarabaeidae. It is found in Australia (Northern Territory, South Australia).

== Description ==
Adults reach a length of about 16–18 mm (0.63–0.71 in). The pronotum and elytra are iridescent and reddish. The surface of the pygidium surface is swollen and irregularly punctured. The larger punctures bear tiny setae.
