= Colpochila bella =

Scientific classification
- Kingdom: Animalia
- Phylum: Arthropoda
- Clade: Pancrustacea
- Class: Insecta
- Order: Coleoptera
- Suborder: Polyphaga
- Infraorder: Scarabaeiformia
- Family: Scarabaeidae
- Genus: Colpochila
- Species: C. bella

Binomial name
- Colpochila bella Blackburn, 1890

Synonyms
- Haplonycha cara Lea, 1917; Haplonycha iridipennis Lea, 1917; Haplonycha amoena Blackburn, 1906; Haplonycha neglecta Blackburn, 1906; Haplonycha paradoxa Blackburn, 1906; Colpochila gracilis Blackburn, 1890

Species of beetle

Colpochila bella is a species of beetle of the family Scarabaeidae. It is found in Australia (South Australia, Victoria, Western Australia).

== Description ==
Adults reach a length of about 14–19 mm (0.55–0.75 in). The pronotum is shining, iridescent and reddish or black and the elytra are shining, iridescent and black, reddish or yellowish brown.
