= Colpochila potens =

Scientific classification
- Kingdom: Animalia
- Phylum: Arthropoda
- Clade: Pancrustacea
- Class: Insecta
- Order: Coleoptera
- Suborder: Polyphaga
- Infraorder: Scarabaeiformia
- Family: Scarabaeidae
- Genus: Colpochila
- Species: C. potens

Binomial name
- Colpochila potens Britton, 1986

Species of beetle

Colpochila potens is a species of beetle of the family Scarabaeidae. It is found in Australia (Western Australia).

== Description ==
Adults reach a length of about 23 mm (0.91 in). The pronotum is reddish, while the elytra are yellowish brown. There are long setae along the margins of the pronotum, while the pygidium is covered with short setae.
