= Colpochila jungi =

Scientific classification
- Kingdom: Animalia
- Phylum: Arthropoda
- Clade: Pancrustacea
- Class: Insecta
- Order: Coleoptera
- Suborder: Polyphaga
- Infraorder: Scarabaeiformia
- Family: Scarabaeidae
- Genus: Colpochila
- Species: C. jungi

Binomial name
- Colpochila jungi (Blackburn, 1906)

Synonyms
- Haplonycha jungi Blackburn, 1906

Species of beetle

Colpochila jungi is a species of beetle of the family Scarabaeidae. It is found in Australia (Western Australia).

== Description ==
Adults reach a length of about 14–16 mm (0.55–0.63 in). The pronotum is shining and reddish-black, while the elytra are shining and yellowish brown. They are very similar to Colpochila calabyi.
