= Colpochila taylori =

Scientific classification
- Kingdom: Animalia
- Phylum: Arthropoda
- Clade: Pancrustacea
- Class: Insecta
- Order: Coleoptera
- Suborder: Polyphaga
- Infraorder: Scarabaeiformia
- Family: Scarabaeidae
- Genus: Colpochila
- Species: C. taylori

Binomial name
- Colpochila taylori Szito, 1994

Species of beetle

Colpochila taylori is a species of beetle of the family Scarabaeidae. It is found in Australia (Western Australia).

== Description ==
Adults reach a length of about 24–29 mm (0.94–1.14 in). The head is reddish-brown. The pronotum and scutellum are also reddish-brown, but also shining and iridescent. The elytra are chestnut brown, shining and iridescent.

== Etymology ==
The species is named for Bob and Mary Taylor, farmers at Harrismith.
