= Colpochila faceta =

Scientific classification
- Kingdom: Animalia
- Phylum: Arthropoda
- Clade: Pancrustacea
- Class: Insecta
- Order: Coleoptera
- Suborder: Polyphaga
- Infraorder: Scarabaeiformia
- Family: Scarabaeidae
- Genus: Colpochila
- Species: C. faceta

Binomial name
- Colpochila faceta (Blackburn, 1906)

Synonyms
- Haplonycha faceta Blackburn, 1906

Species of beetle

Colpochila faceta is a species of beetle of the family Scarabaeidae. It is found in Australia (Western Australia).

== Description ==
Adults reach a length of about 16–17 mm (0.63–0.67 in). They have a highly contrasted, shining reddish brown head and pronotum, and shining pale yellowish elytra. There is a dense fringe of short, scale-like setae on the posterior margin of the pygidium.
