= Colpochila gagatina =

Scientific classification
- Kingdom: Animalia
- Phylum: Arthropoda
- Clade: Pancrustacea
- Class: Insecta
- Order: Coleoptera
- Suborder: Polyphaga
- Infraorder: Scarabaeiformia
- Family: Scarabaeidae
- Genus: Colpochila
- Species: C. gagatina

Binomial name
- Colpochila gagatina (Burmeister, 1855)

Synonyms
- Haplonycha gagatina Burmeister, 1855; Haplonycha pygidialis Lea, 1930

Species of beetle

Colpochila gagatina is a species of beetle of the family Scarabaeidae. It is found in Australia (New South Wales, Victoria).

== Description ==
Adults reach a length of about 14–16 mm (0.55–0.63 in). The head and pronotum appear dull black, while the elytra are shining black. The pygidium is finely and very densely punctured, and the surface is glabrous or has at most very few very short erect setae.
