= Colpochila carnabyi =

Scientific classification
- Kingdom: Animalia
- Phylum: Arthropoda
- Clade: Pancrustacea
- Class: Insecta
- Order: Coleoptera
- Suborder: Polyphaga
- Infraorder: Scarabaeiformia
- Family: Scarabaeidae
- Genus: Colpochila
- Species: C. carnabyi

Binomial name
- Colpochila carnabyi Britton, 1986

Species of beetle

Colpochila carnabyi is a species of beetle of the family Scarabaeidae. It is found in Australia (Western Australia).

== Description ==
Adults reach a length of about 25–27 mm (0.98–1.06 in). They have a uniform, shining, dark mahogany coloured body.
