= Colpochila bicolor =

Scientific classification
- Kingdom: Animalia
- Phylum: Arthropoda
- Clade: Pancrustacea
- Class: Insecta
- Order: Coleoptera
- Suborder: Polyphaga
- Infraorder: Scarabaeiformia
- Family: Scarabaeidae
- Genus: Colpochila
- Species: C. bicolor

Binomial name
- Colpochila bicolor Blackburn, 1890

Species of beetle

Colpochila bicolor is a species of beetle of the family Scarabaeidae. It is found in Australia (South Australia, Victoria).

== Description ==
Adults reach a length of about 14–15 mm (0.55–0.59 in). The head, thorax, scutellum and abdomen are black, while the elytra are pale yellowish brown. The pronotum and elytra are usually iridescent.
