= Colpochila pubescens =

Scientific classification
- Kingdom: Animalia
- Phylum: Arthropoda
- Clade: Pancrustacea
- Class: Insecta
- Order: Coleoptera
- Suborder: Polyphaga
- Infraorder: Scarabaeiformia
- Family: Scarabaeidae
- Genus: Colpochila
- Species: C. pubescens

Binomial name
- Colpochila pubescens Britton, 1986

Species of beetle

Colpochila pubescens is a species of beetle of the family Scarabaeidae. It is found in Australia (Queensland).

== Description ==
Adults reach a length of about 18 mm (0.71 in). The pronotum and elytra are shining and reddish and there are short, semi-erect, pale setae on the clypeus, frons, pronotum, scutellum, elytra and pygidium.
