= Colpochila picta =

Scientific classification
- Kingdom: Animalia
- Phylum: Arthropoda
- Clade: Pancrustacea
- Class: Insecta
- Order: Coleoptera
- Suborder: Polyphaga
- Infraorder: Scarabaeiformia
- Family: Scarabaeidae
- Genus: Colpochila
- Species: C. picta

Binomial name
- Colpochila picta Britton, 1986

Species of beetle

Colpochila picta is a species of beetle of the family Scarabaeidae. It is found in Australia (Western Australia).

== Description ==
Adults reach a length of about 14–16 mm (0.55–0.63 in). The head, pronotum, scutellum and abdomen are reddish, while the elytra are dark brown.
