= Colpochila tarsalis =

Scientific classification
- Kingdom: Animalia
- Phylum: Arthropoda
- Clade: Pancrustacea
- Class: Insecta
- Order: Coleoptera
- Suborder: Polyphaga
- Infraorder: Scarabaeiformia
- Family: Scarabaeidae
- Genus: Colpochila
- Species: C. tarsalis

Binomial name
- Colpochila tarsalis (Lea, 1924)

Synonyms
- Haplonycha tarsalis Lea, 1924

Species of beetle

Colpochila tarsalis is a species of beetle of the family Scarabaeidae. It is found in Australia (Western Australia).

== Description ==
Adults reach a length of about 12 mm (0.47 in). The clypeus is pale yellowish with black edges, the frons is reddish, but darkened laterally and the edges of the eyes are black. The pronotum is pale yellow with black margins and two dark brown spots. The scutellum is yellowish in middle, grading to brown at the edges. The disc of the elytra is yellowish, while the margins are darkened. The pygidium is yellow.
