= Colpochila tindalei =

Scientific classification
- Kingdom: Animalia
- Phylum: Arthropoda
- Clade: Pancrustacea
- Class: Insecta
- Order: Coleoptera
- Suborder: Polyphaga
- Infraorder: Scarabaeiformia
- Family: Scarabaeidae
- Genus: Colpochila
- Species: C. tindalei

Binomial name
- Colpochila tindalei (Lea, 1926)

Synonyms
- Haplonycha tindalei Lea, 1926

Species of beetle

Colpochila tindalei is a species of beetle of the family Scarabaeidae. It is found in Australia (Northern Territory).

== Description ==
Adults reach a length of about 15–21 mm (0.59–0.83 in). The head, pronotum and scutellum are dark reddish, while most of the elytra are pale yellowish (only the base is reddish).
