= Colpochila immatura =

Scientific classification
- Kingdom: Animalia
- Phylum: Arthropoda
- Clade: Pancrustacea
- Class: Insecta
- Order: Coleoptera
- Suborder: Polyphaga
- Infraorder: Scarabaeiformia
- Family: Scarabaeidae
- Genus: Colpochila
- Species: C. immatura

Binomial name
- Colpochila immatura (Lea, 1930)

Synonyms
- Haplonycha immatura Lea, 1930

Species of beetle

Colpochila griffithi is a species of beetle of the family Scarabaeidae. It is found in Australia (South Australia).

== Description ==
Adults reach a length of about 11 mm (0.43 in). They are pale yellowish brown and have prominent eyes.
