= Colpochila crassiventris =

Scientific classification
- Kingdom: Animalia
- Phylum: Arthropoda
- Clade: Pancrustacea
- Class: Insecta
- Order: Coleoptera
- Suborder: Polyphaga
- Infraorder: Scarabaeiformia
- Family: Scarabaeidae
- Genus: Colpochila
- Species: C. crassiventris

Binomial name
- Colpochila crassiventris (Blanchard, 1850)

Synonyms
- Haplonycha fimbricollis Lea, 1924; Haplonycha roei Burmeister, 1855

Species of beetle

Colpochila crassiventris is a species of beetle of the family Scarabaeidae. It is found in Australia (Western Australia).

== Description ==
Adults reach a length of about 23–29 mm (0.91–1.14 in). The pronotum is dull and reddish or yellowish brown, while the elytra are dull and yellowish brown.
