= Colpochila carinata =

Scientific classification
- Kingdom: Animalia
- Phylum: Arthropoda
- Clade: Pancrustacea
- Class: Insecta
- Order: Coleoptera
- Suborder: Polyphaga
- Infraorder: Scarabaeiformia
- Family: Scarabaeidae
- Genus: Colpochila
- Species: C. carinata

Binomial name
- Colpochila carinata Blackburn, 1890

Species of beetle

Colpochila carinata is a species of beetle of the family Scarabaeidae. It is found in Australia (Queensland, New South Wales, Australian Capital Territory).

== Description ==
Adults reach a length of about 22–25 mm (0.87–0.98 in). The pronotum is iridescent and reddish, while the elytra are iridescent and yellowish brown.
