= Colpochila iridea =

Scientific classification
- Kingdom: Animalia
- Phylum: Arthropoda
- Clade: Pancrustacea
- Class: Insecta
- Order: Coleoptera
- Suborder: Polyphaga
- Infraorder: Scarabaeiformia
- Family: Scarabaeidae
- Genus: Colpochila
- Species: C. iridea

Binomial name
- Colpochila iridea (Lea, 1930)

Synonyms
- Haplonycha iridea Lea, 1930

Species of beetle

Colpochila iridea is a species of beetle of the family Scarabaeidae. It is found in Australia (Western Australia, South Australia).

== Description ==
Adults reach a length of about 10–13 mm (0.39–0.51 in). The head, pronotum and scutellum are reddish, while the elytra are dark brown or black and strongly iridescent.
