= Colpochila abdita =

Scientific classification
- Kingdom: Animalia
- Phylum: Arthropoda
- Clade: Pancrustacea
- Class: Insecta
- Order: Coleoptera
- Suborder: Polyphaga
- Infraorder: Scarabaeiformia
- Family: Scarabaeidae
- Genus: Colpochila
- Species: C. abdita

Binomial name
- Colpochila abdita Britton, 1986

Species of beetle

Colpochila abdita is a species of beetle of the family Scarabaeidae. It is found in Australia (Western Australia).

== Description ==
Adults reach a length of about 25–30 mm (0.98–1.18 in). The pronotum is shining and reddish. The elytra are dull, iridescent and yellowish brown.
