= Colpochila ignota =

Scientific classification
- Kingdom: Animalia
- Phylum: Arthropoda
- Clade: Pancrustacea
- Class: Insecta
- Order: Coleoptera
- Suborder: Polyphaga
- Infraorder: Scarabaeiformia
- Family: Scarabaeidae
- Genus: Colpochila
- Species: C. ignota

Binomial name
- Colpochila ignota Britton, 1986

Species of beetle

Colpochila ignota is a species of beetle of the family Scarabaeidae. It is found in Australia (Western Australia).

== Description ==
Adults reach a length of about 20–25 mm (0.79–0.98 in). The pronotum is iridescent and reddish, while the elytra are iridescent and yellowish brown.
