= Colpochila parva =

Scientific classification
- Kingdom: Animalia
- Phylum: Arthropoda
- Clade: Pancrustacea
- Class: Insecta
- Order: Coleoptera
- Suborder: Polyphaga
- Infraorder: Scarabaeiformia
- Family: Scarabaeidae
- Genus: Colpochila
- Species: C. parva

Binomial name
- Colpochila parva Britton, 1986

Species of beetle

Colpochila parva is a species of beetle of the family Scarabaeidae. It is found in Australia (Queensland).

== Description ==
Adults reach a length of about 12–13 mm (0.47–0.51 in). The pronotum is shining and reddish, while the elytra are shining and yellowish brown. They are very similar to Colpochila iota, and can only be distinguished by the shape of the aedeagus.
