= Colpochila palpalis =

Scientific classification
- Kingdom: Animalia
- Phylum: Arthropoda
- Clade: Pancrustacea
- Class: Insecta
- Order: Coleoptera
- Suborder: Polyphaga
- Infraorder: Scarabaeiformia
- Family: Scarabaeidae
- Genus: Colpochila
- Species: C. palpalis

Binomial name
- Colpochila palpalis Blackburn, 1895

Species of beetle

Colpochila palpalis is a species of beetle of the family Scarabaeidae. It is found in Australia (South Australia, Northern Territory, Queensland, New South Wales).

== Description ==
Adults reach a length of about 21–23 mm (0.83–0.91 in). The pronotum is shining and reddish, while the elytra are shining and yellowish brown. The disc of the pronotum is sparsely punctured.
