= Colpochila crepera =

Scientific classification
- Kingdom: Animalia
- Phylum: Arthropoda
- Clade: Pancrustacea
- Class: Insecta
- Order: Coleoptera
- Suborder: Polyphaga
- Infraorder: Scarabaeiformia
- Family: Scarabaeidae
- Genus: Colpochila
- Species: C. crepera

Binomial name
- Colpochila crepera Britton, 1986

Species of beetle

Colpochila crepera is a species of beetle of the family Scarabaeidae. It is found in Australia (Western Australia).

== Description ==
Adults reach a length of about 15 mm (0.59 in). The head, pronotum, scutellum and elytra are shining dark reddish brown. The elytra are strongly iridescent. The pygidium is dark brown, very sparsely punctured and with a few short setae on the disc.
