= Colpochila diabolica =

Scientific classification
- Kingdom: Animalia
- Phylum: Arthropoda
- Clade: Pancrustacea
- Class: Insecta
- Order: Coleoptera
- Suborder: Polyphaga
- Infraorder: Scarabaeiformia
- Family: Scarabaeidae
- Genus: Colpochila
- Species: C. diabolica

Binomial name
- Colpochila diabolica Szito, 1995

Species of beetle

Colpochila diabolica is a species of beetle of the family Scarabaeidae. It is found in Australia (Western Australia).

== Description ==
Adults reach a length of about 15–18 mm (0.59–0.71 in). The head is dark reddish-brown, while the pronotum is castaneous and dull, but dark reddish-brown along the anterior margin. The scutellum is reddish-brown and the elytra are iridescent and reddish black.

== Etymology ==
The species name is derived from Latin diabolica (meaning devilish) and refers to the densely setose surface and highly iridescent, black colour of the elytra.
