= Colpochila pygmaea =

Scientific classification
- Kingdom: Animalia
- Phylum: Arthropoda
- Clade: Pancrustacea
- Class: Insecta
- Order: Coleoptera
- Suborder: Polyphaga
- Infraorder: Scarabaeiformia
- Family: Scarabaeidae
- Genus: Colpochila
- Species: C. pygmaea

Binomial name
- Colpochila pygmaea Blackburn, 1890

Species of beetle

Colpochila pygmaea is a species of beetle of the family Scarabaeidae. It is found in Australia (South Australia).

== Description ==
Adults reach a length of about 14–16 mm (0.55–0.63 in). The pronotum and elytra are shining and reddish and the basal half of the pygidium is sparsely punctured, and has a few fine setae near the base, although some specimens are without setae.
