= Colpochila castanea =

Scientific classification
- Kingdom: Animalia
- Phylum: Arthropoda
- Clade: Pancrustacea
- Class: Insecta
- Order: Coleoptera
- Suborder: Polyphaga
- Infraorder: Scarabaeiformia
- Family: Scarabaeidae
- Genus: Colpochila
- Species: C. castanea

Binomial name
- Colpochila castanea Britton, 1986

Species of beetle

Colpochila castanea is a species of beetle of the family Scarabaeidae. It is found in Australia (South Australia).

== Description ==
Adults reach a length of about 14–16 mm (0.55–0.63 in). The pronotum is shining, reddish and bears a few long setae in the middle near the base. The elytra are shining, iridescent, and reddish-black.
