= Colpochila chinnicki =

Scientific classification
- Kingdom: Animalia
- Phylum: Arthropoda
- Clade: Pancrustacea
- Class: Insecta
- Order: Coleoptera
- Suborder: Polyphaga
- Infraorder: Scarabaeiformia
- Family: Scarabaeidae
- Genus: Colpochila
- Species: C. chinnicki

Binomial name
- Colpochila chinnicki Britton, 1986

Species of beetle

Colpochila chinnicki is a species of beetle of the family Scarabaeidae. It is found in Australia (Northern Territory, Western Australia).

== Description ==
Adults reach a length of about 22–27 mm (0.87–1.06 in). The pronotum is dull and reddish, while the elytra are iridescent and yellowish brown.
