= Colpochila gibbosicollis =

Scientific classification
- Kingdom: Animalia
- Phylum: Arthropoda
- Clade: Pancrustacea
- Class: Insecta
- Order: Coleoptera
- Suborder: Polyphaga
- Infraorder: Scarabaeiformia
- Family: Scarabaeidae
- Genus: Colpochila
- Species: C. gibbosicollis

Binomial name
- Colpochila gibbosicollis Blackburn, 1890

Species of beetle

Colpochila gibbosicollis is a species of beetle of the family Scarabaeidae. It is found in Australia (Western Australia, Northern Territory).

== Description ==
Adults reach a length of about 14–20 mm (0.55–0.79 in). The pronotum is shining and reddish, while the elytra are shining and reddish or yellowish brown.
