= Colpochila efficax =

Scientific classification
- Kingdom: Animalia
- Phylum: Arthropoda
- Clade: Pancrustacea
- Class: Insecta
- Order: Coleoptera
- Suborder: Polyphaga
- Infraorder: Scarabaeiformia
- Family: Scarabaeidae
- Genus: Colpochila
- Species: C. efficax

Binomial name
- Colpochila efficax Britton, 1986

Species of beetle

Colpochila efficax is a species of beetle of the family Scarabaeidae. It is found in Australia (Western Australia).

== Description ==
Adults reach a length of about 26–28 mm (1.0–1.1 in). The pronotum is dull and reddish and the elytra are dull and yellowish brown.
