= Colpochila flava =

Scientific classification
- Kingdom: Animalia
- Phylum: Arthropoda
- Clade: Pancrustacea
- Class: Insecta
- Order: Coleoptera
- Suborder: Polyphaga
- Infraorder: Scarabaeiformia
- Family: Scarabaeidae
- Genus: Colpochila
- Species: C. flava

Binomial name
- Colpochila flava Szito, 1995

Species of beetle

Colpochila flava is a species of beetle of the family Scarabaeidae. It is found in Australia (Western Australia).

== Description ==
Adults reach a length of about 14–17 mm (0.55–0.67 in). The head is reddish orange, while the pronotum and scutellum are orange, shining and iridescent. The elytra are yellowish orange, shining and iridescent.

== Etymology ==
The species name is derived from Latin flavus (meaning yellow) and refers to the colour of the species.
