= Colpochila infernalis =

Scientific classification
- Kingdom: Animalia
- Phylum: Arthropoda
- Clade: Pancrustacea
- Class: Insecta
- Order: Coleoptera
- Suborder: Polyphaga
- Infraorder: Scarabaeiformia
- Family: Scarabaeidae
- Genus: Colpochila
- Species: C. infernalis

Binomial name
- Colpochila infernalis Britton, 1986

Species of beetle

Colpochila infernalis is a species of beetle of the family Scarabaeidae. It is found in Australia (South Australia).

== Description ==
Adults reach a length of about 14 mm (0.55 in). The pronotum is black, while the elytra are black to dark brown. The setae on the margins of the pronotum and elytra and on the ventral surface are fine and white and the pygidium is sparsely and irregularly punctured.
