= Colpochila pilosa =

Scientific classification
- Kingdom: Animalia
- Phylum: Arthropoda
- Clade: Pancrustacea
- Class: Insecta
- Order: Coleoptera
- Suborder: Polyphaga
- Infraorder: Scarabaeiformia
- Family: Scarabaeidae
- Genus: Colpochila
- Species: C. pilosa

Binomial name
- Colpochila pilosa (Blackburn, 1906)

Synonyms
- Haplonycha pilosa Blackburn, 1906

Species of beetle

Colpochila pilosa is a species of beetle of the family Scarabaeidae. It is found in Australia (Northern Territory, Western Australia, South Australia).

== Description ==
Adults reach a length of about 23–28 mm (0.91–1.10 in). The pronotum is shining and black, while the elytra are shining and yellowish brown. The pygidium is shining and unpunctured, and without setae in the middle.
