= Colpochila dilatata =

Scientific classification
- Kingdom: Animalia
- Phylum: Arthropoda
- Clade: Pancrustacea
- Class: Insecta
- Order: Coleoptera
- Suborder: Polyphaga
- Infraorder: Scarabaeiformia
- Family: Scarabaeidae
- Genus: Colpochila
- Species: C. dilatata

Binomial name
- Colpochila dilatata (Lea, 1917)

Synonyms
- Haplonycha dilatata Lea, 1917

Species of beetle

Colpochila dilatata is a species of beetle of the family Scarabaeidae. It is found in Australia (Queensland).

== Description ==
Adults reach a length of about 11–12 mm (0.43–0.47 in). The pronotum and elytra are shining and reddish. They are similar to Colpochila paula, but may be distinguished by the granular surface of the pygidium and the form of the aedeagus.
