= Colpochila sinuaticollis =

Scientific classification
- Kingdom: Animalia
- Phylum: Arthropoda
- Clade: Pancrustacea
- Class: Insecta
- Order: Coleoptera
- Suborder: Polyphaga
- Infraorder: Scarabaeiformia
- Family: Scarabaeidae
- Genus: Colpochila
- Species: C. sinuaticollis

Binomial name
- Colpochila sinuaticollis Blackburn, 1890

Synonyms
- Haplonycha semiopaca Lea, 1917; Haplonycha arvicola Blackburn, 1906; Haplonycha egregia Blackburn, 1906; Haplonycha electa Blackburn, 1906; Haplonycha rustica Blackburn, 1906; Haplonycha sabulicola Blackburn, 1906; Colpochila fraterna Blackburn, 1890

Species of beetle

Colpochila sinuaticollis is a species of beetle of the family Scarabaeidae. It is found in Australia (South Australia, Western Australia).

== Description ==
Adults reach a length of about 15–19 mm (0.59–0.75 in). They are very variable in colour. In some specimens, the head, pronotum and elytra are black. However, the pronotum and elytra may also be reddish. The length of the setae along the margins of the elytra and the posterior margin of the propygidium is also variable.
