= Colpochila nitida =

Scientific classification
- Kingdom: Animalia
- Phylum: Arthropoda
- Clade: Pancrustacea
- Class: Insecta
- Order: Coleoptera
- Suborder: Polyphaga
- Infraorder: Scarabaeiformia
- Family: Scarabaeidae
- Genus: Colpochila
- Species: C. nitida

Binomial name
- Colpochila nitida Britton, 1986

Species of beetle

Colpochila nitida is a species of beetle of the family Scarabaeidae. It is found in Australia (Western Australia).

== Description ==
Adults reach a length of about 18 mm (0.71 in). They are shining and black and have a fringe of pale setae on the lateral and apical edges of the elytra, as well as short, semi-erect setae on the pygidium.
