= Colpochila spadix =

Scientific classification
- Kingdom: Animalia
- Phylum: Arthropoda
- Clade: Pancrustacea
- Class: Insecta
- Order: Coleoptera
- Suborder: Polyphaga
- Infraorder: Scarabaeiformia
- Family: Scarabaeidae
- Genus: Colpochila
- Species: C. spadix

Binomial name
- Colpochila spadix (Blackburn, 1906)

Synonyms
- Haplonycha spadix Blackburn, 1906

Species of beetle

Colpochila spadix is a species of beetle of the family Scarabaeidae. It is found in Australia (Western Australia, Queensland).

== Description ==
Adults reach a length of about 16–20 mm (0.63–0.79 in). The pronotum is shining and reddish or yellowish brown, while the elytra are shining and yellowish brown.
