= Colpochila villosa =

Scientific classification
- Kingdom: Animalia
- Phylum: Arthropoda
- Clade: Pancrustacea
- Class: Insecta
- Order: Coleoptera
- Suborder: Polyphaga
- Infraorder: Scarabaeiformia
- Family: Scarabaeidae
- Genus: Colpochila
- Species: C. villosa

Binomial name
- Colpochila villosa (Lea, 1917)

Synonyms
- Haplonycha villosa Lea, 1917

Species of beetle

Colpochila villosa is a species of beetle of the family Scarabaeidae. It is found in Australia (Queensland, New South Wales).

== Description ==
Adults reach a length of about 18–22 mm (0.71–0.87 in). The pronotum and elytra are shining and reddish. There are long, erect setae on the clypeus, frons, the anterior and posterior margins, and the anterior half of the disc of the pronotum. The elytra have sparse, long setae.
