= Colpochila lutea =

Scientific classification
- Kingdom: Animalia
- Phylum: Arthropoda
- Clade: Pancrustacea
- Class: Insecta
- Order: Coleoptera
- Suborder: Polyphaga
- Infraorder: Scarabaeiformia
- Family: Scarabaeidae
- Genus: Colpochila
- Species: C. lutea

Binomial name
- Colpochila lutea Britton, 1986

Species of beetle

Colpochila lutea is a species of beetle of the family Scarabaeidae. It is found in Australia (Northern Territory).

== Description ==
Adults reach a length of about 13 mm (0.51 in). The pronotum, scutellum and elytra are pale yellowish, the former with all margins brown. Both the pronotum and elytra are iridescent, the latter bearing minute, erect, pale setae. The pygidium is short, erect setae.
