= Colpochila punctiventris =

Scientific classification
- Kingdom: Animalia
- Phylum: Arthropoda
- Clade: Pancrustacea
- Class: Insecta
- Order: Coleoptera
- Suborder: Polyphaga
- Infraorder: Scarabaeiformia
- Family: Scarabaeidae
- Genus: Colpochila
- Species: C. punctiventris

Binomial name
- Colpochila punctiventris Blackburn, 1890

Synonyms
- Haplonycha gymnopyga Lea, 1917

Species of beetle

Colpochila punctiventris is a species of beetle of the family Scarabaeidae. It is found in Australia (South Australia, New South Wales, Victoria, Western Australia).

== Description ==
Adults reach a length of about 18–20 mm (0.71–0.79 in). The pronotum is iridescent and reddish-black, while the elytra are shining, iridescent and reddish-black.
