= Colpochila ruficeps =

Scientific classification
- Kingdom: Animalia
- Phylum: Arthropoda
- Clade: Pancrustacea
- Class: Insecta
- Order: Coleoptera
- Suborder: Polyphaga
- Infraorder: Scarabaeiformia
- Family: Scarabaeidae
- Genus: Colpochila
- Species: C. ruficeps

Binomial name
- Colpochila ruficeps (Burmeister, 1855)

Synonyms
- Haplonycha ruficeps Burmeister, 1855; Haplonycha fimbriata Lea, 1924

Species of beetle

Colpochila ruficeps is a species of beetle of the family Scarabaeidae. It is found in Australia (Western Australia).

== Description ==
Adults reach a length of about 16–20 mm (0.63–0.79 in). The elytra are pale yellowish and usually dull, with dense, short, pale setae at the apical angle and on the sides.
