= Colpochila calabyi =

Scientific classification
- Kingdom: Animalia
- Phylum: Arthropoda
- Clade: Pancrustacea
- Class: Insecta
- Order: Coleoptera
- Suborder: Polyphaga
- Infraorder: Scarabaeiformia
- Family: Scarabaeidae
- Genus: Colpochila
- Species: C. calabyi

Binomial name
- Colpochila calabyi Britton, 1986

Species of beetle

Colpochila calabyi is a species of beetle of the family Scarabaeidae. It is found in Australia (Western Australia).

== Description ==
Adults reach a length of about 13–16 mm (0.51–0.63 in). The pronotum and elytra are shining and yellowish brown.
