= Colpochila nitens =

Scientific classification
- Kingdom: Animalia
- Phylum: Arthropoda
- Clade: Pancrustacea
- Class: Insecta
- Order: Coleoptera
- Suborder: Polyphaga
- Infraorder: Scarabaeiformia
- Family: Scarabaeidae
- Genus: Colpochila
- Species: C. nitens

Binomial name
- Colpochila nitens Britton, 1986

Species of beetle

Colpochila nitens is a species of beetle of the family Scarabaeidae. It is found in Australia (Western Australia).

== Description ==
Adults reach a length of about 17–20 mm (0.67–0.79 in). The pronotum is shining and reddish, while the elytra are shining and reddish to dark brown. They are similar to Colpochila nigromarginata, but may be distinguished by the shape of the clypeus and the more densely punctured pronotum.
