= Colpochila vanga =

Scientific classification
- Kingdom: Animalia
- Phylum: Arthropoda
- Clade: Pancrustacea
- Class: Insecta
- Order: Coleoptera
- Suborder: Polyphaga
- Infraorder: Scarabaeiformia
- Family: Scarabaeidae
- Genus: Colpochila
- Species: C. vanga

Binomial name
- Colpochila vanga Britton, 1986

Species of beetle

Colpochila vanga is a species of beetle of the family Scarabaeidae. It is found in Australia (Northern Territory).

== Description ==
Adults reach a length of about 20–22 mm (0.79–0.87 in). The pronotum is shining and reddish, while the elytra are shining and yellowish brown.
