= Colpochila paula =

Scientific classification
- Kingdom: Animalia
- Phylum: Arthropoda
- Clade: Pancrustacea
- Class: Insecta
- Order: Coleoptera
- Suborder: Polyphaga
- Infraorder: Scarabaeiformia
- Family: Scarabaeidae
- Genus: Colpochila
- Species: C. paula

Binomial name
- Colpochila paula Britton, 1986

Species of beetle

Colpochila paula is a species of beetle of the family Scarabaeidae. It is found in Australia (Northern Territory, Queensland).

== Description ==
Adults reach a length of about 12–14 mm (0.47–0.55 in). The pronotum and elytra are shining and reddish. They are very similar to Colpochila dilatata, but may be distinguished by the less densely punctured pygidium and the shape of the aedeagus.
