= Colpochila pulchella =

Scientific classification
- Kingdom: Animalia
- Phylum: Arthropoda
- Clade: Pancrustacea
- Class: Insecta
- Order: Coleoptera
- Suborder: Polyphaga
- Infraorder: Scarabaeiformia
- Family: Scarabaeidae
- Genus: Colpochila
- Species: C. pulchella

Binomial name
- Colpochila pulchella Blackburn, 1890

Synonyms
- Haplonycha novemarticulata Lea, 1917; Haplonycha octoarticulata Lea, 1917

Species of beetle

Colpochila pulchella is a species of beetle of the family Scarabaeidae. It is found in Australia (South Australia, New South Wales).

== Description ==
Adults reach a length of about 13–16 mm (0.51–0.63 in). The colour varies from black to dark reddish brown. The elytra are iridescent and have a dense lateral and apical fringe of setae.
