= Colpochila gigantea =

Scientific classification
- Kingdom: Animalia
- Phylum: Arthropoda
- Clade: Pancrustacea
- Class: Insecta
- Order: Coleoptera
- Suborder: Polyphaga
- Infraorder: Scarabaeiformia
- Family: Scarabaeidae
- Genus: Colpochila
- Species: C. gigantea

Binomial name
- Colpochila gigantea (Burmeister, 1855)

Synonyms
- Haplonycha gigantea Burmeister, 1855; Haplonycha fimbripennis Lea, 1924

Species of beetle

Colpochila gigantea is a species of beetle of the family Scarabaeidae. It is found in Australia (Western Australia).

== Description ==
Adults reach a length of about 27–31 mm (1.1–1.2 in). The head, pronotum and scutellum are dark reddish brown, while the elytra are pale yellowish and iridescent. The pygidium is densely covered with short, semi-erect setae.
