= Colpochila nigromarginata =

Scientific classification
- Kingdom: Animalia
- Phylum: Arthropoda
- Clade: Pancrustacea
- Class: Insecta
- Order: Coleoptera
- Suborder: Polyphaga
- Infraorder: Scarabaeiformia
- Family: Scarabaeidae
- Genus: Colpochila
- Species: C. nigromarginata

Binomial name
- Colpochila nigromarginata Britton, 1986

Species of beetle

Colpochila nigromarginata is a species of beetle of the family Scarabaeidae. It is found in Australia (South Australia).

== Description ==
Adults reach a length of about 16–18 mm (0.63–0.71 in). The pronotum is reddish-black and the elytra are reddish to dark brown. They are similar to Colpochila nitens, but may be distinguished by the shape of the clypeus, the less dense punctuation of the pronotum and the shape of the aedeagus.
