= Colpochila gouldii =

Scientific classification
- Kingdom: Animalia
- Phylum: Arthropoda
- Clade: Pancrustacea
- Class: Insecta
- Order: Coleoptera
- Suborder: Polyphaga
- Infraorder: Scarabaeiformia
- Family: Scarabaeidae
- Genus: Colpochila
- Species: C. gouldii

Binomial name
- Colpochila gouldii (Hope, 1841)

Synonyms
- Sericesthis gouldii Hope, 1841; Haplonycha pulchripennis Lea, 1924

Species of beetle

Colpochila gouldii is a species of beetle of the family Scarabaeidae. It is found in Australia (Queensland, Northern Territory).

== Description ==
Adults reach a length of about 21–25 mm (0.83–0.98 in). The pronotum is iridescent and reddish, while the elytra are iridescent and reddish or yellowish brown.
