= Colpochila obesa =

Scientific classification
- Kingdom: Animalia
- Phylum: Arthropoda
- Clade: Pancrustacea
- Class: Insecta
- Order: Coleoptera
- Suborder: Polyphaga
- Infraorder: Scarabaeiformia
- Family: Scarabaeidae
- Genus: Colpochila
- Species: C. obesa

Binomial name
- Colpochila obesa (Boisduval, 1835)

Synonyms
- Melolontha obesa Boisduval, 1835; Haplonycha thoracica Blackburn, 1906; Melolontha destructor Tepper, 1878; Haplonycha pectoralis Blanchard, 1850; Serica tasmanica Blanchard, 1846

Species of beetle

Colpochila obesa is a species of beetle of the family Scarabaeidae. It is found in Australia (Northern Territory, South Australia, New South Wales, Victoria, southern Queensland, Tasmania).

== Description ==
Adults reach a length of about 15–17 mm (0.59–0.67 in). The pronotum is shining and reddish-black, while the elytra are shining and reddish. The elytra are unusually expanded in the posterior half.
