= Colpochila laminata =

Scientific classification
- Kingdom: Animalia
- Phylum: Arthropoda
- Clade: Pancrustacea
- Class: Insecta
- Order: Coleoptera
- Suborder: Polyphaga
- Infraorder: Scarabaeiformia
- Family: Scarabaeidae
- Genus: Colpochila
- Species: C. laminata

Binomial name
- Colpochila laminata Blackburn, 1890

Synonyms
- Colpochila dubia Blackburn, 1890

Species of beetle

Colpochila laminata is a species of beetle of the family Scarabaeidae. It is found in Australia (South Australia, Western Australia, Victoria, New South Wales, Northern Territory).

== Description ==
Adults reach a length of about 25–28 mm (0.98–1.10 in). The pronotum and elytra are shining and reddish.
