= Colpochila solida =

Scientific classification
- Kingdom: Animalia
- Phylum: Arthropoda
- Clade: Pancrustacea
- Class: Insecta
- Order: Coleoptera
- Suborder: Polyphaga
- Infraorder: Scarabaeiformia
- Family: Scarabaeidae
- Genus: Colpochila
- Species: C. solida

Binomial name
- Colpochila solida Blackburn, 1890

Synonyms
- Haplonycha sloanei Blackburn, 1906

Species of beetle

Colpochila solida is a species of beetle of the family Scarabaeidae. It is found in Australia (South Australia, New South Wales, Victoria, Queensland, Northern Territory, Western Australia).

== Description ==
Adults reach a length of about 18–24 mm (0.71–0.94 in). They are variable in colour. The pronotum and elytra are shining, iridescent and black or reddish.
